= Prisoners' rights =

Rights of detainees

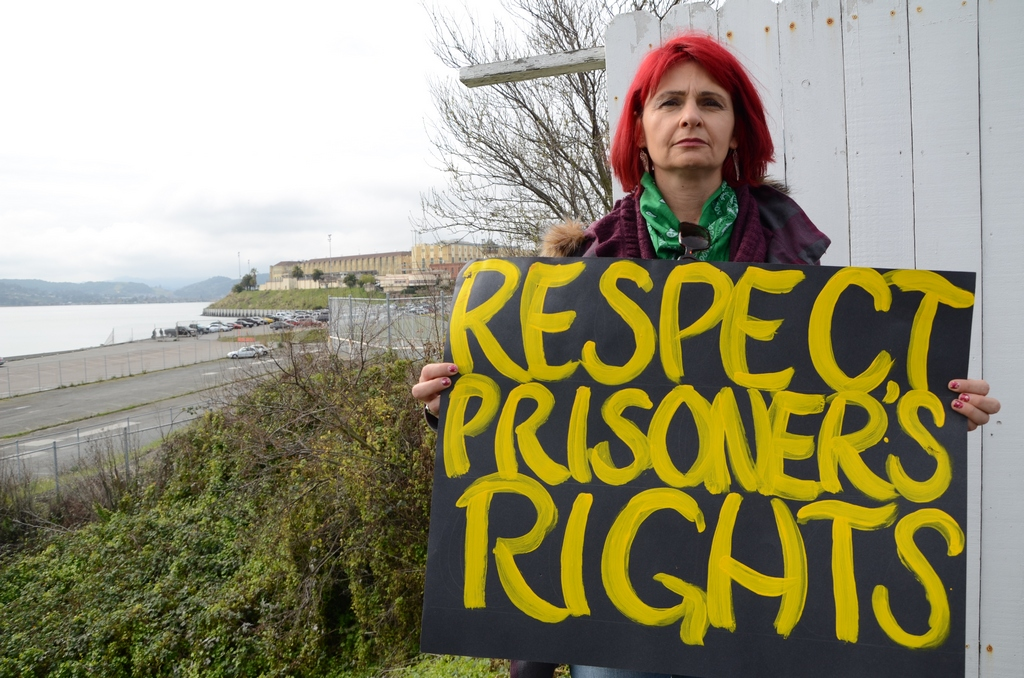
Occupy4Prisoners, 2012

The rights of civilian and military prisoners are governed by both national and international law. International conventions include the International Covenant on Civil and Political Rights; the United Nations' Minimum Rules for the Treatment of Prisoners, the European Committee for the Prevention of Torture and Inhuman or Degrading Treatment or Punishment, and the Convention on the Rights of Persons with Disabilities.

== Rights and advocacy by country ==
=== Asia ===
- Prisons in India
- Prisoners' rights in the Middle East
  - Prisoners' rights in Israel
    - Palestinian prisoners of Israel
  - Human rights in the Islamic Republic of Iran
    - Committee for the Defense of Prisoners' Rights (Iran)
    - 2010 Iranian political prisoners' hunger strike for prisoners' rights
- Human rights in China
  - Penal system in China
  - Laogai
  - Xinjiang re-education camps
  - Notable prisons:
    - Qincheng Prison
    - Tilanqiao Prison
- Penal system of Japan
- Malaysian Prison Department
  - Caning in Malaysia
  - 2020 Malaysia movement control order
- Human rights in North Korea
  - Prisons in North Korea
  - Kwalliso
    - Hoeryong concentration camp
- Prisons in Pakistan
- Re-education camp (Vietnam)

=== Europe ===
- Prison conditions in France
- Prisons in Germany
- Crime in Italy
  - Article 41-bis prison regime
- Human rights in Russia
  - Prisoners' Union
  - Human rights in the Soviet Union
  - Gulag
- United Kingdom prison population
  - Preservation of the Rights of Prisoners
  - Hirst v United Kingdom (No 2)
  - Voting Eligibility (Prisoners) Bill
  - 1981 Irish hunger strike
- Children of Prisoners Europe

=== North America ===
Photos from rallies to close the Guantanamo Bay detention camp

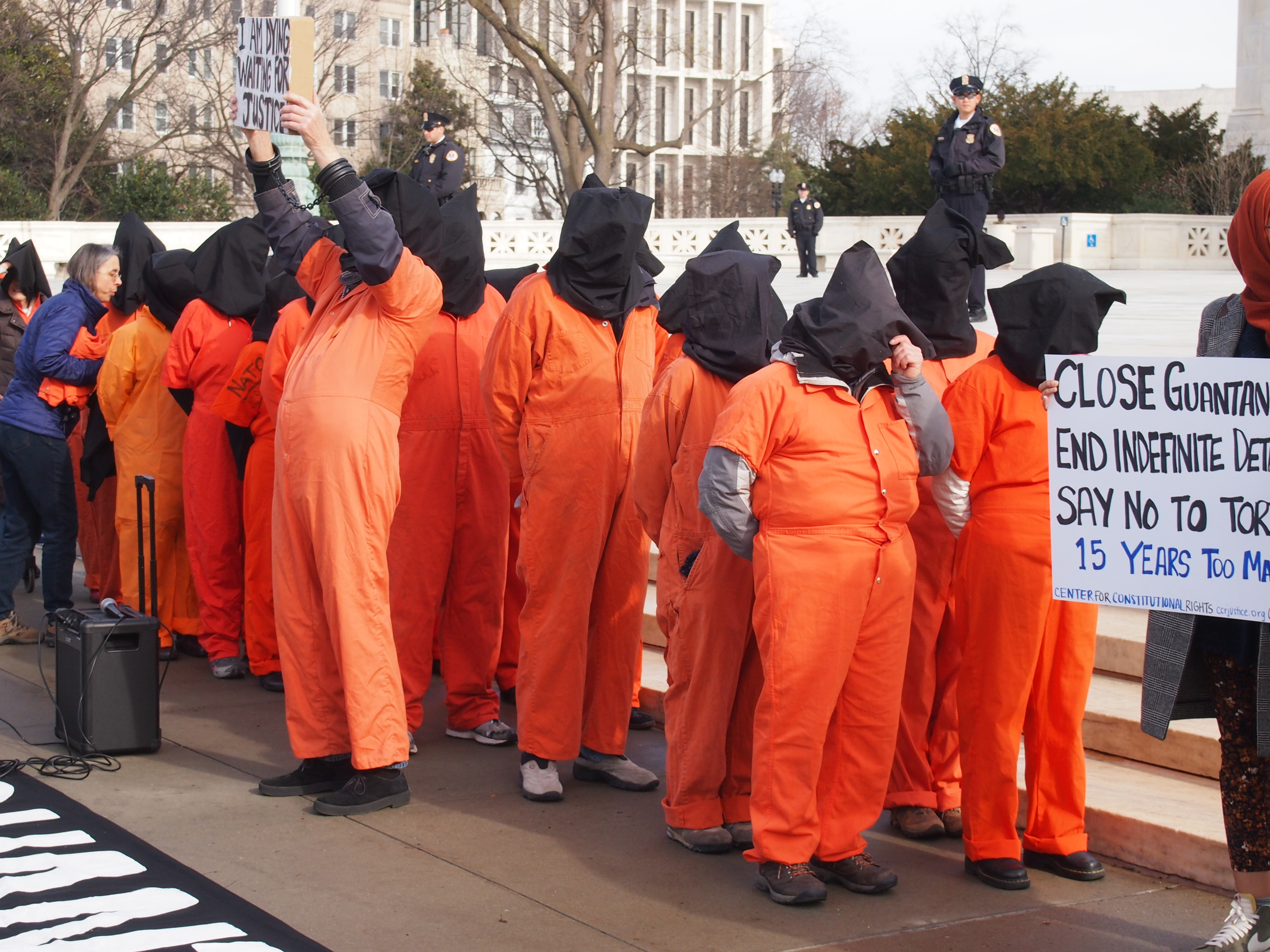
2017 rally to close Guantanamo

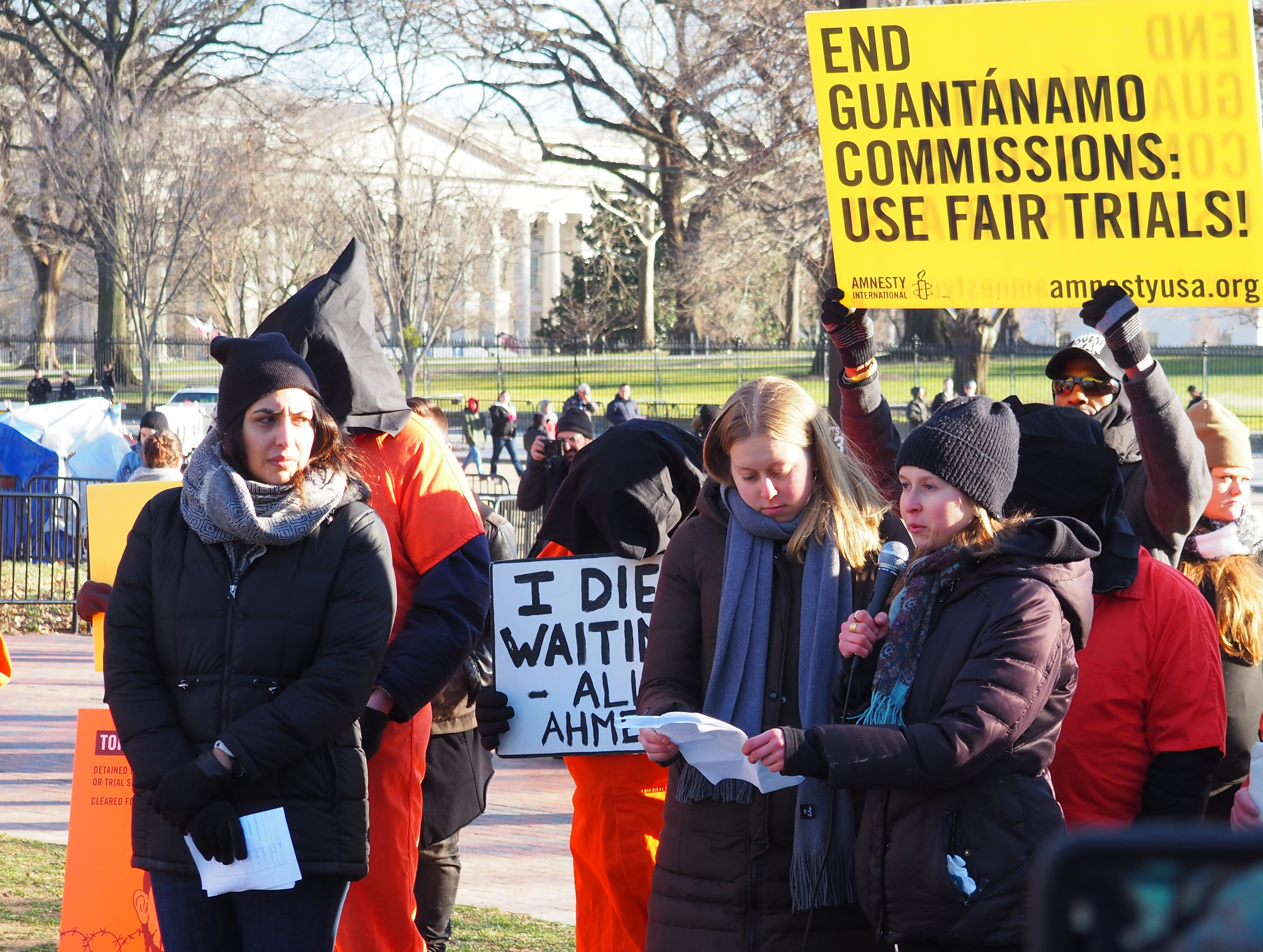
2019 rally to close Guantanamo

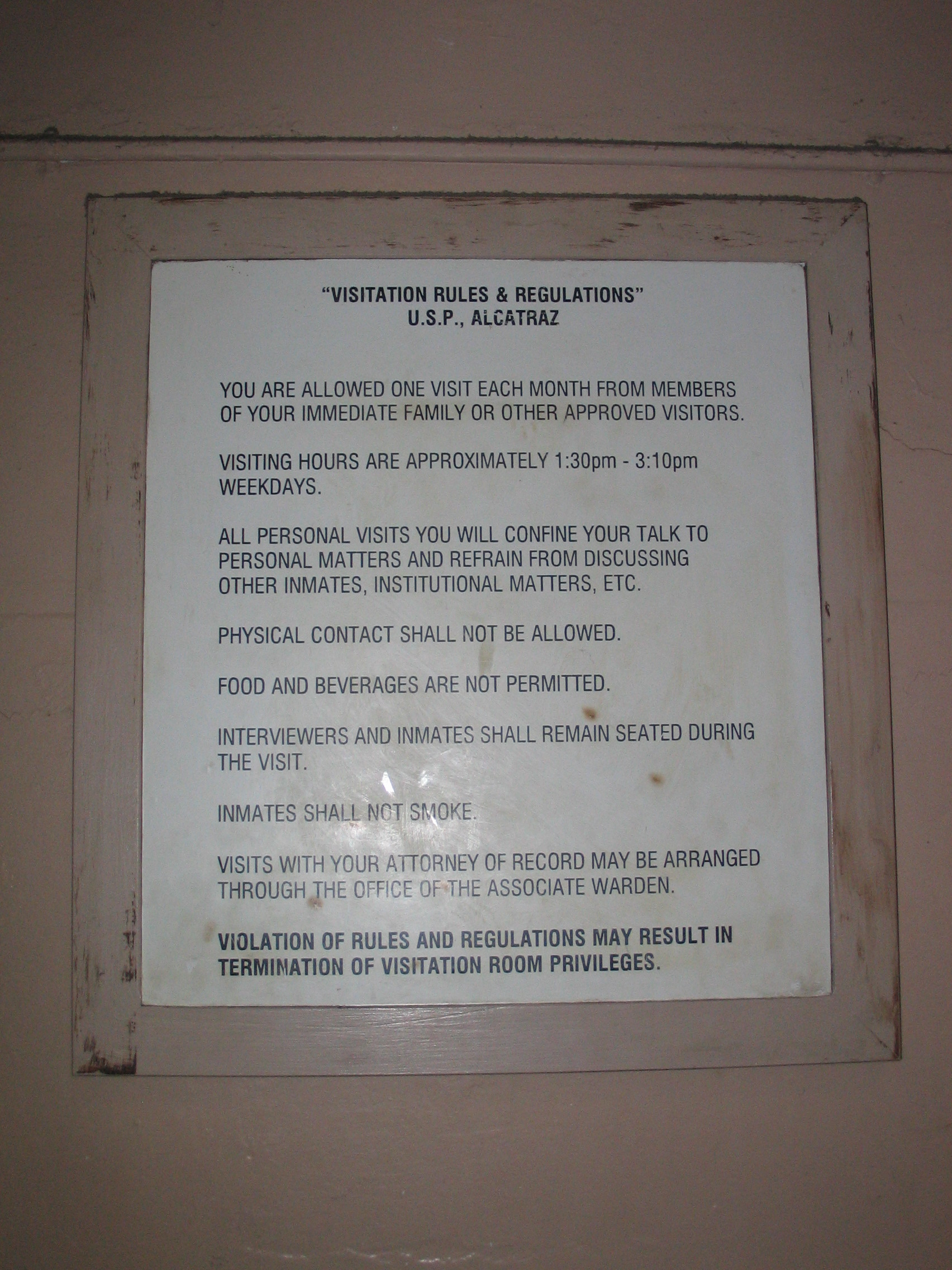
Visitation rules at Alcatraz

- Incarceration in Canada
  - Correctional Service of Canada
  - John Howard Society
- In the United States:
  - Human rights in the United States
  - Incarceration in the United States
  - Prisoner rights in the United States
    - Decarceration in the United States
    - Prisoner abuse in the United States
    - Felony disenfranchisement in the United States
    - Penal labor in the United States
    - Prison rape in the United States
    - Organ donation in the United States prison population
    - Mentally ill people in United States jails and prisons
    - Political prisoners in the United States
  - Notable groups:
    - November Coalition
    - Critical Resistance and Incite!
    - Incarcerated Workers Organizing Committee
    - Black and Pink
    - Prisoners Rights Union
  - Notable events:
    - 1971 Attica Prison riot
    - 1973 Wapole Prison uprising
    - Abu Ghraib torture and prisoner abuse
    - Guantanamo Bay detention camp
    - Orleans Parish Prison abandonment during Hurricane Katrina
    - 2013 California prisoner hunger strike
    - 2016 U.S. prison strike
    - 2018 U.S. prison strike
  - Chain gang
  - Convict leasing

=== Oceania ===
- Punishment in Australia
  - Indonesian children in Australian prisons
- Prisoners' rights in New Zealand
  - Voting rights of prisoners in New Zealand
- Human rights in Vanuatu

=== International ===
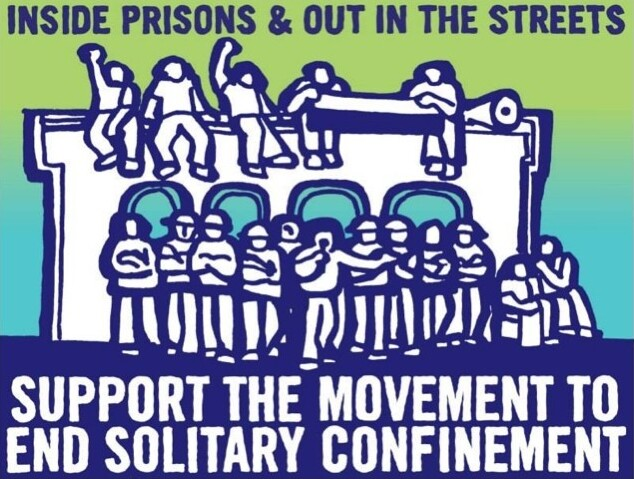

- Prisoners' rights in international law
- Standard Minimum Rules for the Treatment of Prisoners
- List of countries by incarceration rate
- List of hunger strikes
- List of prisons
- Penal Reform International

== See also ==
- Books to Prisoners
- Death in custody
- Disfranchisement
- Human rights issues related to the COVID-19 pandemic
- Human rights
- Incarceration and health
- LGBT people in prison
- Prison abolition movement
- Prison healthcare
- Prison overcrowding
- Prison strike
- Prisoner abuse
- Prison–industrial complex
- Private prison
- Security of person
- Sentencing disparity
- Solitary confinement
