= Prison strike =

Type of protest by prison inmates

A prison strike is an inmate strike or work stoppage that occurs inside a prison, generally to protest poor conditions or low wages for penal labor. Prison strikes may also include hunger strikes.

== United States ==
In September 2016, large, coordinated prison strikes took place in 11 states, with inmates claiming they are subjected to poor sanitary conditions and jobs that amount to forced labor and modern day slavery. Organizers, which include the Industrial Workers of the World labor union, asserted that it was the largest prison strike in U.S. history.

On August 21, 2018, another prison strike, sponsored by Jailhouse Lawyers Speak and the Incarcerated Workers Organizing Committee, took place in 17 states from coast to coast to protest what inmates regard as unfair treatment by the criminal justice system. In particular, inmates objected to being excluded from the 13th amendment which forces them to work for pennies a day, a condition they assert is tantamount to "modern-day slavery". The strike was the result of a call to action after a deadly riot occurred at Lee Correctional Institution in April of that year, which was sparked by neglect and inhumane living conditions.

=== Legalities ===
At the national level, 28 CFR 541.3 declares "encouraging others to refuse to work, or to participate in a work stoppage" to be a "High Severity Level Prohibited Act" and authorizes solitary confinement for periods of up to a year for each violation.

The California Code of Regulations (CCR) states that "[p]articipation in a strike or work stoppage", "[r]efusal to perform work or participate in a program as ordered or assigned", and "[r]ecurring failure to meet work or program expectations within the inmate's abilities when lesser disciplinary methods failed to correct the misconduct" is "serious misconduct" under §3315(a)(3)(L), leading to gang affiliation under CCR §3000.

== List of prison strikes ==
- 1970 Folsom Prison strike
- Walpole prison strike (1973)
- Cuban political prisoners hunger strike of 2010
- 2010 Evin prison hunger strike
- 2010 Georgia prison strike
- 2013 California prisoner hunger strike
- 2016 U.S. prison strike
- 2018 U.S. prison strike

== See also ==
- Prisoners' Rights
- Strike Action
