= 2010 Georgia prison strike =

Penal labor dispute in Georgia, United States

- Date: December 9–15, 2010
- Location: Georgia, United States

The 2010 Georgia prison strike was a prison strike involving prisoners at 7 prisons in the U.S. state of Georgia. The strike, organized by the prisoners using contraband cell phones, began on December 9 and ended on December 15. It was reported at the time to be the largest prison strike in United States history and was followed by similar strikes in several other states, as well as nationwide strikes several years later, in 2016 and 2018.

== Background and beginning ==
The labor strike was organized by prison inmates over the course of several months in 2010 using contraband cell phones, with The New York Times claiming that the strike may be the first instance of cell phones being used to organize a grassroots protest of this nature in prisons. Several inmates with cell phones had called The New York Times and said they had learned about the planned strike through text messages and were unaware of who exactly were behind it. American prison activist Elaine Brown called the strike an "organic effort" by the inmates. The strike, involving 7 prisons in the state, officially began on December 9, 2010, with inmates refusing to work and many refusing to leave their cells. According to an article published in The New York Times, the prisoners "would not perform chores, work for the Corrections Department’s industrial arm or shop at prison commissaries until a list of demands is addressed, including compensation for their work, more educational opportunities, better food and sentencing rules changes."

The prisons involved were:

- Augusta State Medical Prison
- Baldwin State Prison
- Hancock State Prison
- Hays State Prison
- Macon State Prison
- Smith State Prison
- Telfair State Prison

While an exact number was not specified, it was widely reported that several thousand inmates were participating in the strike.

== Course of the strike ==
Following the start of the prison strike, the strikers issued a press release that outlined several demands. The demands, as reported by the San Francisco Bay Area Independent Media Center, included the following demands:

- A LIVING WAGE FOR WORK: In violation of the 13th Amendment to the Constitution prohibiting slavery and involuntary servitude, the DOC demands prisoners work for free.
- EDUCATIONAL OPPORTUNITIES: For the great majority of prisoners, the DOC denies all opportunities for education beyond the GED, despite the benefit to both prisoners and society.
- DECENT HEALTH CARE: In violation of the Eighth Amendment prohibition against cruel and unusual punishments, the DOC denies adequate medical care to prisoners, charges excessive fees for the most minimal care and is responsible for extraordinary pain and suffering.
- AN END TO CRUEL AND UNUSUAL PUNISHMENTS: In further violation of the Eighth Amendment, the DOC is responsible for cruel prisoner punishments for minor infractions of rules.
- DECENT LIVING CONDITIONS: Georgia prisoners are confined in over-crowded, substandard conditions, with little heat in winter and oppressive heat in summer.
- NUTRITIONAL MEALS: Vegetables and fruit are in short supply in DOC facilities while starches and fatty foods are plentiful.
- VOCATIONAL AND SELF-IMPROVEMENT OPPORTUNITIES: The DOC has stripped its facilities of all opportunities for skills training, self-improvement and proper exercise.
- ACCESS TO FAMILIES: The DOC has disconnected thousands of prisoners from their families by imposing excessive telephone charges and innumerable barriers to visitation.
- JUST PAROLE DECISIONS: The Parole Board capriciously and regularly denies parole to the majority of prisoners despite evidence of eligibility.

On December 9, in anticipation of the protest, several of the prisons involved were placed on lockdown. While the strike was initially planned as a one-day event, it was extended for several more days after prisoners reported that prison officers at several of the prisons had responded to the strike with violence. On December 15, multiple news sources announced that the strike was over. That same day, an article published in ColorLines called it "the largest prison strike in U.S. history." Following the strike action in Georgia, similar large-scale prison strikes were held at prisons in several other U.S. states, including Illinois, North Carolina, Virginia, and Washington. Several years later in 2016, a nationwide prison strike, referred to as "one of the biggest prison protests in modern history", was held during the 45th anniversary of the Attica Prison riot. In 2018, another nationwide prison strike was held that affected prisons in at least 17 states.

== See also ==
- Incarceration in the United States
- Mobile phones in prison
- Prisoners' rights
- 2018 U.S. prison strike
- 2016 U.S. prison strike
