= Prison divestment =

Prison divestment is a movement that aims to stop institutions from investing in private prison corporations. It highlights the problem of mass incarceration in the United States, and raises concerns about human rights abuses and exploitation by private prison corporations.

== Background ==
The movement began in 2011, when the nonprofit organization Freedom to Thrive (formerly Enlace) launched its Prison Industry Divestment Campaign. The movement spread to Columbia University in 2013 when an undergraduate student named Asha Rosa launched the Columbia Student Divest campaign. In the following years, the movement spread to Yale, Northwestern, Princeton, Swarthmore, and the City University of New York, as undergraduate and graduate students started their own prison divestment chapters.

Advocates for prison divestment argue that private prison corporations engage in unethical practices by furthering mass incarceration. The United States government contracts private corporations to manage correctional facilities, where incarcerated individuals perform penal labor for low wages. Corporation-run facilities, often called "private prisons," are extremely profitable. GEO Group and CoreCivic, the two largest private prison corporations in the United States, recorded a combined revenue of $4.3 billion in 2016. Minimum occupancy clauses are included in the majority of private prison contracts, which require the state to keep facilities at 80-100% occupancy or pay a fine to the managing corporation. Combined with corporate lobbying efforts, minimum occupancy clauses are effective in incentivizing increased incarceration.

== History ==
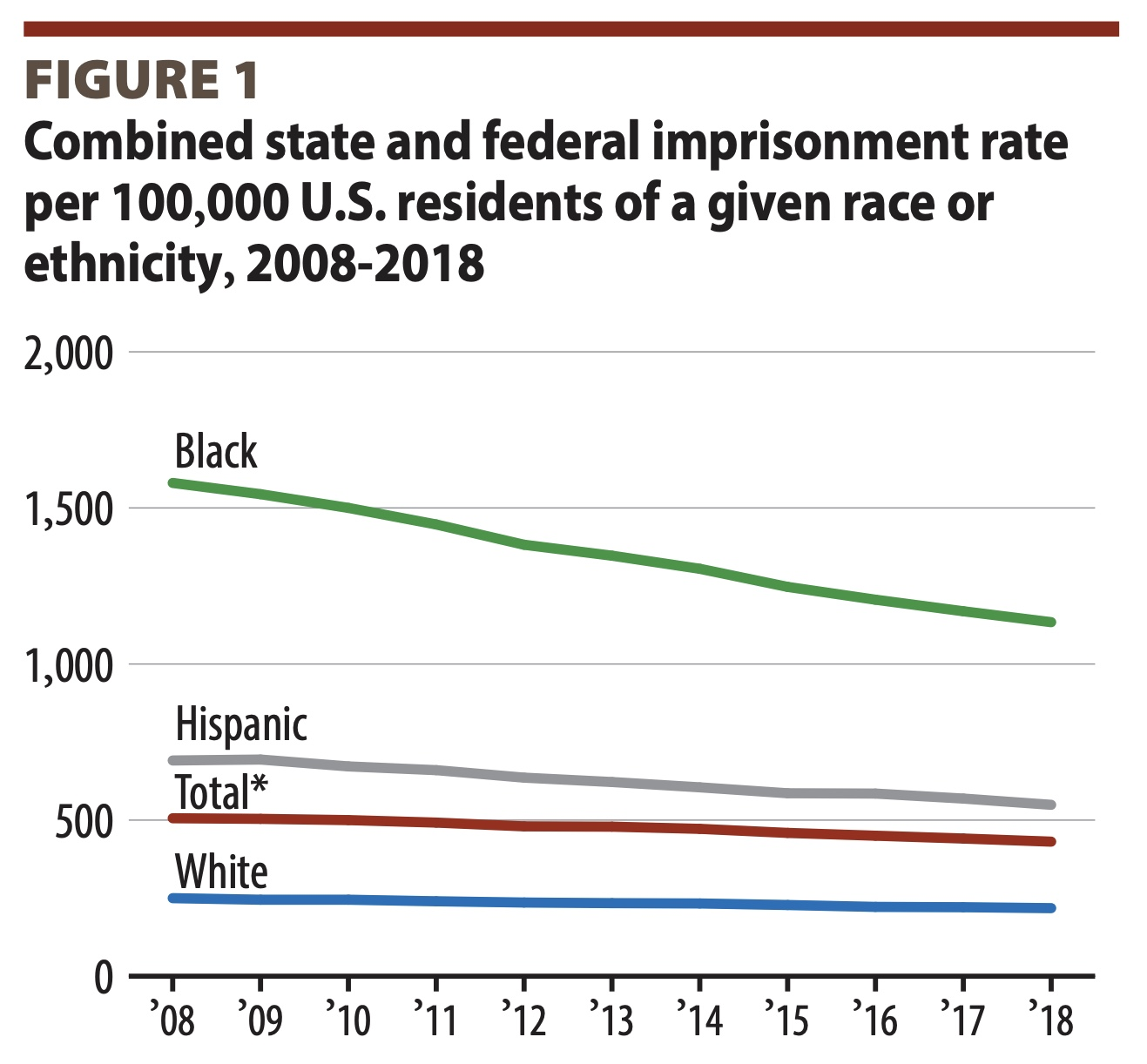
United States imprisonment rate from 2008-2018 by race or ethnicity

The prison divestment movement argues that mass incarceration predominantly impacts communities of color, specifically Black men. According to the Bureau of Justice Statistics, 18-19 year old Black males were 12.7 times as likely to be incarcerated compared to white males in the same age range. Hispanic males aged 18–19 were 3.3 times as likely to be incarcerated compared to 18-19 year old white males. Scholars such as Michelle Alexander in her book The New Jim Crow, argue that African Americans have been subject to a racial caste system since the founding of the United States. Social control over African-Americans has evolved from slavery, to the Jim Crow era, to the war on drugs, and the disproportionate incarceration of Black men. Before mass incarceration, extrajudicial violence like lynching was used to subjugate Black Americans. "Tough on crime" narratives were used by politicians to pass legislation like the 1984 Comprehensive Crime Control and Safe Streets Act, the 1986 Anti-Drug Abuse Act, and the Violent Crime Control and Safe Streets Act of 1994. As of 2015, 30 percent of arrests for drug crimes and 40 percent of drug-related incarcerations were of African Americans.

== Impact ==
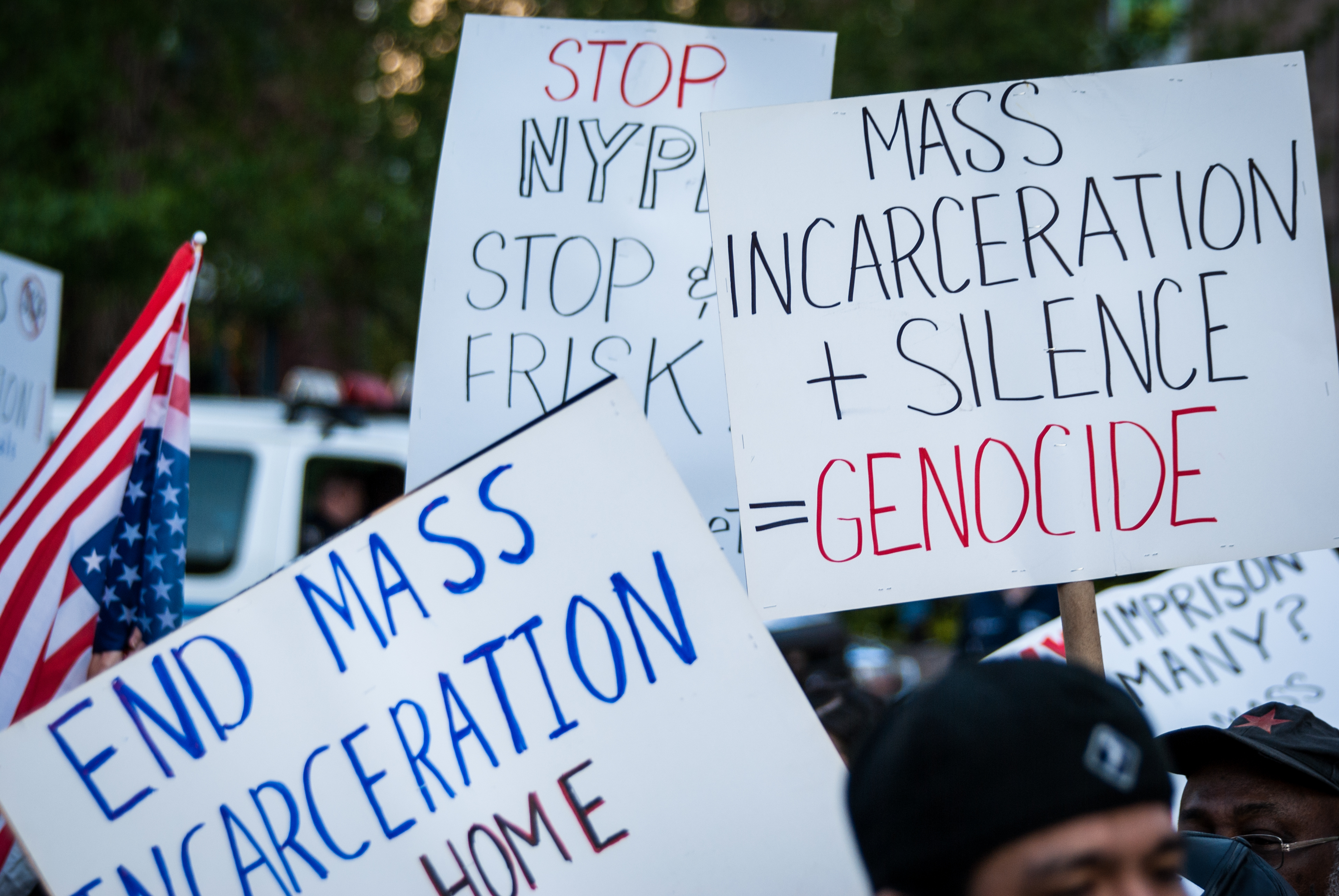
Protestors demand an end to mass incarceration and police brutality

In April 2013, Florida Atlantic University canceled a $6 million contract with Geo Group due to intense student pressure. The university president had planned to name the Florida Atlantic football stadium after Geo Group CEO and FAU alum George Zoley, but was forced to withdraw his plan and resign. In April 2015, Columbia University president Lee Bollinger agreed to remove any direct stock ownership from private prison corporations, which was estimated to be around $8 million. Later that year, the University of California system announced that it would sell $25 million stake in Geo Group and CoreCivic.

Professor William MacAskill at Oxford University has pointed out that when institutions sell "sin stocks" in an attempt to invest ethically, other neutral or unethical investors will buy it. Prisoner's rights advocates acknowledge that divestment does not have an overwhelming fiscal impact on private prison companies, but does have a public relations impact. When Lee Bollinger wrote his statement of support for prison divestment, he amplified the issue of mass incarceration, and provided the divestment movement a larger platform for advocacy.
