= Prisoner Human Rights Movement =

The Prisoner Human Rights Movement was launched in 2011 by Pelican Bay State Prison inmates in response to large numbers of inmates being moved from general prison populations to solitary-confinement units after allegations of gang affiliation or political organizing. Its goal is to improve living conditions for inmates in California.

== Purpose ==
The Prisoner Human Rights Movement wanted to address inadequacies in the California Department of Corrections and Rehabilitation, including:

1. Systemic problems in 180- and 270-designed (level 4) prisons and institutions, including chains of command, staff assessment and Department of Corrections culture
2. Prisoners' Inmate Welfare Funds (IWF) and budget allocations
3. Injustice, brutality and human-rights violations

To deal with these issues, the Pelican Bay organizers called for the right to document, expose and challenge abuses and violations; an end to violence and brutality by prison employees; an end to police brutality, inside and outside prison, and the right to safety from retaliation and coercion, threats and blackmail to betray fellow prisoners with false accusations.

== Background ==
Pelican Bay State Prison, California’s only supermax prison, was built in 1989 on the outskirts of Crescent City. Half the prison houses maximum-security inmates in the general population, and the other half holds prisoners in Security Housing Units. Cells in the latter are windowless, 8-by-10-foot (2.4 by 3.0 m) concrete boxes. Inmates are confined to the cells for twenty-two to twenty-three hours a day without access to telephones, television, programs, loved ones and basic human interaction. They receive three meals a day through a small slot at the bottom of their cell door. Inmates housed in the Security Housing Units are subjected to abuse from other inmates and guards.

Inmates are sent to the Security Housing Units at the discretion of correctional administrators. They are sent for a fixed term for breaking a prison rule, or for an indeterminate term for being labeled a prison-gang member. The largest segments of Security Housing Units populations are jailhouse lawyers and political activists. Although inmates identified as gang members are not supposed to be isolated for more than six years, the prison-gang investigation unit often finds new evidence to extend an inmate’s isolation. The only way for these prisoners to leave the Security Housing Units is to debrief. An inmate debriefs by divulging information incriminating other inmates as gang associates. Although inmates (or their families) who debrief can become targets of violence by gangs, they often provide false information about others to escape the Security Housing Units. Assignments in the Security Housing Units can also affect sentencing length and severity. Inmates do not earn credit for time served in the Security Housing Units, extending their sentence and making them eligible for release later than they would otherwise be. Inmates sentenced to life imprisonment are not eligible for parole while they are in the Security Housing Units. For many inmates, the only options for escape are debriefing or death. This essentially removes sentencing from the judiciary and gives it to prison administrators.

In 2007, inmates in the Pelican Bay Security Housing Units spent an average of over two years in isolation before being released into the general population or paroled; some have spent decades in solitary confinement. Every month, about 15 prisoners are paroled from the Security Housing Units with no services to assist with the transition from isolation to freedom.

== Movement ==
In response to the treatment of prisoners housed in Pelican Bay's Security Housing Units, four inmates (Arturo Castellanos, Sitawa Nantambu Jamaa (Ronnie Dewberry), Todd Ashker, and George Franco) began the Prisoner Human Rights Movement. As the movement's principal negotiators, they have organized around the belief that the Department of Corrections is fraught with systemic, deep-rooted problems. The movement's goal is immediate action by the governor of California to remedy the Department of Correction's policies and enforcement and to encourage lawmakers to create effective and genuine improvements to the department.

In addition to the principal negotiators, the Prisoner Human Rights Movement is composed of twenty representatives, local councils, and the plaintiffs in Ashker v. Brown. The principal negotiators, the movement's face and driving force, represent over 100,000 inmates in thirty-three California prisons. Representatives and local councils monitor and record conditions at their prisons, reporting to the principal negotiators. On April 3, 2011, the Pelican Bay negotiators issued five core demands.

== Hunger strikes ==
=== 2011 ===
On July 1, 2011, a hunger strike began. Nearly every prisoner in the Pelican Bay Security Housing Units (over 1,000 inmates) was refusing food, and they were joined by general-population inmates. By the end of the first day, about 6,000 prisoners across California had reportedly participated in the hunger strike. Though levels of participation varied (from inmates partaking only in food purchased from canteens, to liquid sustenance, to refusal of any and all sustenance) the most involved organizers made it clear that they were willing to starve to death to have their demands met. In the first week, supporters on the outside were also engaging with the movement by fasting and participating in solidarity demonstrations across the state. Within the next few weeks, prison and state officials scrambled to deal with the strike. Some prisons used deceptive tactics, like lying about meeting the demands of the strike, or spreading rumors that an inmate had died, attempting to break solidarity between prisoners. Other prisons further isolated prisoners participating in the hunger strike, cutting off communications between the prisoners and the outside world. As the strike wore on, state officials threatened to force feed inmates who were refusing food, though this action is illegal in most cases. Three weeks into the hunger strike, the CDCR agreed to enter negotiations with the Pelican Bay PNs and immediately conceded on a few points. The strike officially ended on July 20. However, most conditions within the prison remained largely unchanged.

The hunger strike resumed on September 26, with about 12,000 people in California and other states participating in the strike. It was called off on October 15, 2011.

=== 2013 ===
The 59-day 2013 California prisoner hunger strike, organized by the Pelican Bay PNs (who became known as the Short Corridor Collective), mobilized 30,000 prisoners across the state. The strike ended when a judge issued a court order allowing the strikers to be force-fed by the state.

== Legal remedies ==
Ashker v. Governor of California (or Ashker v. Brown) was a class action lawsuit filed on May 31, 2012 by the Pelican Bay Hunger Strike negotiators on behalf of inmates housed in Security Housing Units. The case was an amended version of an earlier pro se lawsuit filed by Pelican Bay Security Housing Units inmates Todd Ashker and Danny Troxell. Judge Claudia Ann Wilken of the United States District Court for the Northern District of California presided over the case. It was settled in September 2015, ending indiscriminate solitary confinement in California.

After the settlement, nearly 1,500 prisoners were transferred from Security Housing Units to the general population. Many inmates were sent to Level VI housing, however, which mimicked solitary confinement. In March 2018, a federal court refused to order the Department of Corrections to release long-term Security Housing Units inmates into the general population. The defense counsel noted that the earlier settlement was inadequate for ending indeterminate isolated imprisonment in California.

=== International law ===
In August 2011, the United Nations General Assembly published a Human Rights Council report on torture and other cruel, inhuman or degrading treatment. The report outlines the international consensus that solitary confinement in pretrial detention for more than fifteen days of juveniles or people with mental disabilities is "cruel, inhuman or degrading treatment or punishment and even torture". It describes best practices for states to limit solitary confinement. The report was crucial as a legal defense to the movement's claim that prolonged solitary confinement is a form of torture and a human-rights violation under international law.
