= 2018 U.S. prison strike =

Penal labor dispute in the United States

The 2018 U.S. prison strike was a series of work stoppages and hunger strikes in prisons across the United States from August 21 to September 9, 2018. It was one of the largest prison strikes in US history. Striking workers demanded improved living conditions, an end to forced prison labor, and other prison reforms. The strike was conducted at least partly in response to the April 2018 prison riot at Lee Correctional Institution, which killed seven inmates and was the deadliest US prison riot of the past 25 years.

The start and end dates of the strike were chosen to coincide with the shooting of George Jackson during an escape attempt on August 21, 1971 and with the Attica Prison riot on September 9, 1971.

Strike participants and leaders were punished with solitary confinement, loss of communication privileges, and prison transfers. By 2019, none of the strikers' demands had been met.

== Overview ==
The prison strike was called for and organized primarily by Jailhouse Lawyers Speak and the Incarcerated Workers Organizing Committee, which is a prisoner-led section of Industrial Workers of the World. About 150 organizations endorsed the strike.

Incarcerated workers are generally paid pennies per hour, and in some states they receive no pay.

It is difficult to determine the number of workers involved in the strike. Some estimates indicate that participation may have been lower than for the 2016 US prison strike, although the 2018 strike garnered greater media attention, which focused especially on the prisoners' demands to end unpaid prison labor.

== Demands ==
The following were the demands of the prison strike according to the official page:

1. Immediate improvements to the conditions of prisons and prison policies that recognize the humanity of imprisoned men and women.
2. An immediate end to prison slavery. All persons imprisoned in any place of detention under United States jurisdiction must be paid the prevailing wage in their state or territory for their labor.
3. The Prison Litigation Reform Act must be rescinded, allowing imprisoned humans a proper channel to address grievances and violations of their rights.
4. The Truth in Sentencing Act and the Sentencing Reform Act must be rescinded so that imprisoned humans have a possibility of rehabilitation and parole. No human shall be sentenced to Death by Incarceration or serve any sentence without the possibility of parole.
5. An immediate end to the racial overcharging, over-sentencing, and parole denials of Black and brown humans. Black humans shall no longer be denied parole because the victim of the crime was white, which is a particular problem in southern states.
6. An immediate end to racist gang enhancement laws targeting Black and brown humans.
7. No imprisoned human shall be denied access to rehabilitation programs at their place of detention because of their label as a violent offender.
8. State prisons must be funded specifically to offer more rehabilitation services.
9. Pell grants must be reinstated in all US states and territories.
10. The voting rights of all confined citizens serving prison sentences, pretrial detainees, and so-called “ex-felons” must be counted. Representation is demanded. All voices count.

== Timeline ==
=== Pre-Emptive censorship & repression (June - July 2018) ===
Ronald Brooks was transferred from Angola Prison to the David Wade Correctional Center in late June 2018 after he made a pro-strike video.

In late July, Siddique Hassan was reported for five violations of prison rules, including “Rioting, or encouraging others to riot”. This was most likely a way to prevent him from speaking to the media during the strike as he had during the 2016 Prison Strike.

=== Strike activity begins early (August 2018) ===
On August 9, the first confirmed strike activity began at the GEO Group prison in response to administration cutting family visits, harassing families, strip searching elder family members, and STIU targeting, harassing, and abusing inmates. Three housing units joined in the work stoppage. In response, New Mexico prison officials put all state prisons on lockdown on August 20 as a preemptive measure.

On August 19, prisoners in the Burnside jail in Nova Scotia, Canada held a protest and released a statement in support of the strike and with their own list of demands.

=== Strike begins ===
While most news on strike activity didn't reach the outside on the first day, the strike received widespread attention from numerous news outlets including USA Today, Newsweek and National Public Radio.

At least 200 detained immigrants at the Northwest Detention Center in Tacoma, Washington engaged in a hunger strike and/or work stoppage, releasing a statement stating that they were "acting with solidarity for all those people who are being detained wrongfully," and standing against separation of families.

Heriberto Sharky Garcia, incarcerated in Folsom, California, declared a hunger strike.

Two North Carolina prisons joined the national strike with protesting inmates bringing banners made out of sheets into the yard at Hyde Correctional and five people refused work at Correction Enterprises laundry facility outside Asheville between August 19th and 21st. Community supporters & press at Hyde Correctional were barred from entering a public lot.

There were also unconfirmed reports of 11 out of 143 prisons in Florida being affected, although the Florida Department of Corrections claimed that they had no stoppages, protests, or lockdowns related to the strike.

=== Alleged retaliation ===
Strike participants, their families, and advocacy groups reported that the leaders and organizers of the strike were punished with solitary confinement, loss of communication privileges, and prison transfers.

== See also ==
- 2010 Georgia prison strike
- 2013 California prison hunger strike
- 2016 U.S. prison strike
- Incarceration in the United States
- Prison strike
- Prisoners' rights
