= St. Clair Correctional Facility =

Men's prison in Alabama, United States

Coordinates: 33°44′44″N 86°23′06″W

- Interactive map of St. Clair Correctional Facility
- Location: 1000 St Clair Road Springville, Alabama
- Status: open
- Security class: mixed, including maximum
- Capacity: 1,514
- Opened: 1983
- Managed by: Alabama Department of Corrections

St. Clair Correctional Facility is an Alabama state men's prison located in Springville, St. Clair County, Alabama. The prison was originally built in 1983, and has an operating capacity of 1,514 inmates. The current warden is Guy Noe.

== History ==
The facility was built in 1983. In April 1985 it was site of a major riot. Five employees were beaten and 22 others including the warden and his deputy were held hostage by inmates armed with guns. The prisoners complained of "barbaric conditions".

=== 2014 ===
The Free Alabama Movement, founded by Melvin Ray, an inmate in St. Clair, led at least two nonviolent prison strikes in 2014.

The strike in April explained its motives as an "effort to improve education programs and end overcrowding, harsh sentencing," and to end the 'free labor system'.

Within a year period ending September 2014, six inmates had been killed in the facility. The Alabama non-profit Equal Justice Initiative had already called for a change in leadership three months prior, after inmate Jodey Waldrop was killed in the early morning hours of June 3, for what they described as a pattern of serious neglect and violence, including an incident when the then-warden punched a handcuffed prisoner. As of June 2014, the prison was at 130 percent capacity.

=== 2016 ===
In March 2016 a correctional officer was wounded by a knife trying to break up a fight. On May 13, 2016, another inmate was found dead of unknown causes.

In June 2016 the Equal Justice Initiative filed a motion in federal court arguing that "severe overcrowding, understaffing and dangerous conditions violate the prisoners' constitutional rights," and that the prison's severe understaffing poses a safety risk to guards and correctional officers. The facility runs at 59.5% of full staffing levels, giving it an inmate-to-staff ratio among the highest in U.S. prisons. In the fiscal year ending in September 2016, there were 249 reported assaults at St. Clair.

=== Beyond ===
Press reports indicate that the facility is in a lawless condition. One expert cited "a total breakdown of the necessary basic structures that are required to operate a prison safely."

A prison strike led by FAM began on February 6, 2024. Various groups from the Southeast, including the Tennessee Student Solidarity Network, protested outside St. Clair through the month, including one on February 23. The TSSN stated that "The corporations who are profiting from endless wars, killing Palestinians abroad, and destroying the earth are the same corporations—from Raytheon to McDonald's—profiting from the exploitation of incarcerated people."

The FAM demanded that the following be done:

• Repeal the Habitual Offender Act

• Make sentencing guidelines retroactive

• Create mandatory parole criteria that the board must follow

• Abolish the Sentence of Life Without Parole

• End All Gas Chamber Executions
