= Free Alabama Movement =

American prisoners' rights group

The Free Alabama Movement (FAM) is an inmates rights group based in the United States. With the Incarcerated Workers Organizing Committee, the Free Alabama Movement has organized the 2016 U.S. prison strike that involved an estimated 24,000 prisoners in 24 states, the largest prison strike in U.S. history. The strike began on September 9, 2016, the 45th anniversary of the Attica Prison uprising. The group was founded at St. Clair Correctional Facility in 2013 and has also organized strikes in 2018 and 2022.

== History ==
The Free Alabama Movement was founded at St. Clair Correctional Facility in 2013 by Bennu Hannibal Ra-Sun aka Melvin Ray. Prior to his transfer to St. Clair, the founding member of FAM were incarcerated at Holman Correctional Facility with Richard “Mafundi” Lake, a founding member of the 1970s prison rights group, Inmates for Action. Along with the legal education that they received at Holman, FAM founder credit Lake for his political education.

FAM methods include work strikes, boycotts, protests and social media campaigns. The organization first called for a strike in January 2014. That same year, conversations between FAM and Brianna Peril of the Industrial Workers of the World led to the formation of the Incarcerated Workers Organizing Committee.

=== 2016 U.S. prison strike ===
FAM began organizing the 2016 U.S. prison strike at Holman in response to conditions that are considered a widespread problem in Alabama state prisons, overcrowding and understaffing among them. As part of the strike, inmates refused to work; demands were issued by groups representing each state involved in the strike. In Alabama, correctional officers also went on strike for a weekend.

=== 2018 U.S. prison strike ===
Inmates across the United States organized a nationwide strike between August 21 and September 9, 2018. FAM organizers claim that shortly before the start of the strike, correctional officers at William E. Donaldson Correctional Facility moved one of FAM's key organizers into solitary confinement then released him after the end of the strike.

=== 2022 Alabama prison strike ===
FAM organized a statewide prison strike that commenced on September 26, 2022 and included at least five state facilities. The strike concluded on October 14, 2022.

== See also ==
- Penal labor in the United States
- The Alabama Solution, a 2025 documentary film featuring Ray and Council
