= Aeman Presley =

American serial killer

Aeman Lovel Presley
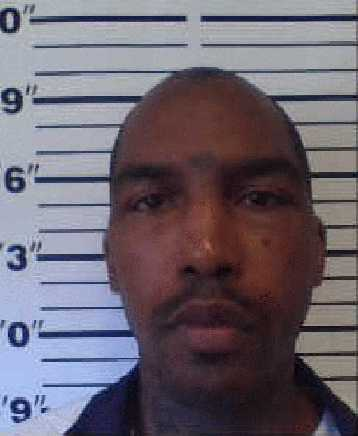
- Mugshot
- Born: 1980 (age 45–46); Chicago, Illinois, U.S.
- Conviction: Murder (4 counts)
- Penalty: Life imprisonment without parole

Details
- Victims: 4
- Span of crimes: September – December 2014
- Country: United States
- State: Georgia
- Date apprehended: For the final time on December 11, 2014
- Imprisoned at: Telfair State Prison

Aeman Lovel Presley (born 1980) is an American serial killer who killed four people over four months in 2014, in Georgia's DeKalb and Fulton Counties. Presley fully admitted his guilt, and as a result of a plea agreement, he was given several terms of life imprisonment without parole.

== Biography ==
Aeman Presley was born in 1980, in Chicago, Illinois. Soon after his birth, his father abandoned the family. In 1992, he joined a gang associated with the Folk Nation and began committing small-time offenses. In order to change this unhealthy lifestyle, Presley and his mother left Chicago in 1995, moving to Stone Mountain, Georgia, a small town with a population of about 6,000. There, Aeman attended the local Stone Mountain High School. In December 1995, as part of a journalistic investigation into the life of juvenile delinquents in the state, Presley, along with several other teens, gave an interview to the TimesDaily, describing his experience as a former gang member.

After graduating high school, he joined the Georgia National Guard, but was fired in the early 2000s, returning to his mother's home in Stone Mountain, where he worked low-skilled labour-intensive jobs. Presley began to exhibit antisocial and violent behavior, developing a drug addiction as well. In December 2002, he was fired from Carmike Cinemas after repeatedly threatening visitors and co-workers alike. In the immediate aftermath, he threatened to kill his former supervisor, who called the police. Aeman was arrested, but avoided prison time, and was instead given a fine and compulsory anger management courses, which he attended for the next several months.

On April 19, 2003, Presley was arrested on charges of assault after beating his mother, heavily resisting the officers and attempting to break the police car's windows while being transported to the station. He was found guilty, but some of the charges were dropped, as his mother came to an agreement with him, with Aeman apologising for his actions. He received a minor sentence, and after his release, he returned to his mother's house. In March 2006, he was rearrested for indecent behavior, and in April of that year, he was convicted and sentenced to several months imprisonment, which he served in the county jail. Released at the end of 2006, he moved to Atlanta, where he met representatives in show business. Thanks to their support, he got a job at an Atlanta TV station, and for the next four years, he worked as an extra in TV shows and news reports. Between 2008 and 2009, he performed supporting roles in the low-budget short films "Exit" and "The Rules", after which he decided he wanted to become a professional actor.

In 2010, Presley left Georgia and moved to Los Angeles, where he rented an apartment and enrolled in the Margie Haber Studio, an acting school based in Beverly Hills. However, his film career did not work out. Despite his previous experience, his acting abilities were considered unconvincing. Over the next three years, he was forced to act as a simple extra during the filmings of various films, unable to pass a single casting to get a role in serious film projects. He spent most of his time at home, drinking alcohol and using drugs. In May 2014, he was detained by the Los Angeles police on charges of illegal drug possession, but was released a day later, due to the lack of a judicial arrest warrant. After an arrest warrant was issued and his apartment searched, Presley left Los Angeles and returned to Atlanta.

== Serial murders ==
After returning to Atlanta, Presley took odd jobs and lived in a homeless shelter. In August, he stole a five-round Taurus Raging Judge revolver from a car, with which he decided to commit robberies. On September 26, he boarded a bus and travelled to DeKalb County, where he came across 53-year-old Calvin Gholston, whom he shot three times. The victim had schizophrenia and dromomania.

On November 23, Presley shot 42-year-old vagrant Dorian Jenkins three times in the chest. Three days later, he shot and killed 68-year-old Tommy Mims, who was sleeping under a railway bridge. After killing Mims, Presley searched for another victim, but instead returned to the crime scene, deciding to fire two additional shots in the dead man's head.

On the night of December 6, Presley travelled to Decatur. In the following early morning, he noticed 44-year-old Karen Pearce heading towards her car. He went up to her and threatened to shoot her with his revolver. Pearce gave up all her valuables, but nevertheless, Presley shot her, killing her instantly.

== Arrest ==
Aeman Presley was arrested on December 11, while trying to pass the underground turnstile without a ticket. He was searched by the officers, who found a bank card, the revolver and a bag of 32 rounds among his personal belongings. He was charged with illegal weapons possession, and taken to the local police station. After a forensic ballistic examination confirmed that the four victims had been killed with the exact gun that he was carrying, Aeman began cooperating with the investigators, confessing to all the murders.

== Trial ==
In September 2015, Presley's trial began at the DeKalb County District Court for the murders of Galston and Pearce. As the result of a plea bargain, he was spared the death penalty and sentenced to two life imprisonment terms without parole in June 2016. After the verdict was announced, Aeman declared to be remorseful for what he had done, and asked the victims' relatives for forgiveness. Following his conviction, in January 2017, Presley stood trial in Fulton County for the murders of Jenkins and Mims. He pleaded guilty to both murders, claiming that after he had killed the first victim, he got addicted to murder, but also declared that he shouldn't be subjected to criminal liability due to his insanity.

== In media ==
An Investigation Discovery show Signs of a Psychopath (season 4) made an episode about the case.

Season 17 Episode 3 (title Blood Lust)of A&E's show The First 48 depicts the investigation into the deaths of 2 of his victims.

== See also ==
- List of serial killers in the United States
