= Macon State Prison =

Prison in Georgia, United States

Coordinates: 32°15′34″N 84°05′29″W

- Interactive map of Macon State Prison
- Location: 2728 Highway 49 South Oglethorpe, Georgia
- Status: open
- Security class: close
- Capacity: 1,762
- Opened: 1994
- Managed by: Georgia Department of Corrections

Macon State Prison is located in Macon County, southwest of Oglethorpe, Georgia on approximately 300 acres (1.2 km^{2}). It was constructed in 1993 and opened in 1994. It is a close security prison, meaning it is a very high security prison. The prison houses inmates deemed the highest potential security risks by the Department of Corrections.

== Housing ==
Macon State Prison consists of seven buildings, each divided into two separate units with forty-eight cells per unit. Fourteen of the units include double cells. Two additional units include forty-eight isolation cells and forty-eight segregation cells. The prison has a maximum capacity of 1,440 inmates. Included in those seven buildings is the medical infirmary, which has ten beds and a medical staff that can perform a wide range of medical procedures. The medical staff is responsible for the overall health and well-being of the prisoners and the other staff members. There is also a ten-man fire department on the prison grounds, which takes care of fires at the prison, and also serves as the local fire department for the surrounding towns. Also located on the prison grounds are several houses that are designated specifically for important prison workers, such as the Warden. The Warden’s house is located on the prison grounds for easy access in case of an emergency, such as a prisoner riot or prisoner escape.

Macon State Prison was one of 7 prisons involved in the 2010 Georgia prison strike.

== Programs ==
Academic: GED, ABE, GSAMS, Remedial, and Special Education. (Macon State Prison has the highest GED graduation rate among prisons in the state of Georgia.)

Substance Abuse: Substance Abuse education, Alcoholics Anonymous/NA, Relapse Prevention, and RSAT.

Counseling: Sex offender, Prerelease, Life Skills, Critical Thinking, Anger Management, Positive Mental Attitude, Parenting, and World of Work.

Recreation: softball, soccer, basketball, and general fitness.

Religious Activities: Several religious activities, Christian religious choir.

== Staff ==
The staff consists of about five hundred employees, three hundred of which are specifically for security purposes, such as tower guards, patrolmen, and security guards. The other two hundred staff members are doctors, nurses, counselors, teachers, and general overseers. The general overseers are the men and women in charge of the prison.

Macon was one of nine Georgia state prisons implicated in an FBI sting operation announced in February 2016. The agency indicted 47 correction officers who'd agreed to deliver illegal drugs while in uniform. These charges were "part of a larger public corruption investigation into Georgia Correctional Facilities".
