= Telfair State Prison =

Georgia male-only state prison in the United States

Coordinates: 32°05′17″N 82°54′34″W

- Interactive map of Telfair State Prison
- Location: 210 Long Bridge Road, McRae–Helena, Georgia
- Security class: close security
- Capacity: 1420
- Opened: 1992
- Managed by: Georgia Department of Corrections
- Warden: Andrew McFarlane

Telfair State Prison is a Georgia Department of Corrections state prison for men located on 210 Long Bridge Road, McRae–Helena, Telfair County, Georgia, United States. The facility opened in 1992 and currently has a capacity of 1,420 prisoners. The Department of Justice opened a criminal investigation of the Georgia State Prisons in 2021 after widespread reports and documentation of violence, assaults, and harassment, particularly of transgender, lesbian, and gay prisoners.

On July 20, 2023, prison guards left Juan Carlos Ramirez Bibiano in an outdoor cell without shade, water, or ice, causing his body to overheat, induce vomiting, and killing him from heat exposure.

Between August and October 2012, two inmates and a corrections officer named Larry Stell were fatally stabbed in the facility.

Telfair was awarded Facility of the Year by Georgia Department of Corrections Commissioner Brian Owens in 2014.

Telfair State was one of seven prisons whose inmates participated in the 2010 Georgia prison strike.

== Notable inmates ==
- Wayne Williams, believed by police to be responsible for at least 23 of the 30 Atlanta murders of 1979–1981
- Aeman Presley, serial killer responsible for four murders.
