= Prison Advice and Care Trust =

UK charity that provides services for prisoners and their families

The Prison Advice and Care Trust (Pact) is an independent UK charity that provides practical services for prisoners and prisoners' families. First established as the Catholic Prisoners Aid Society in 1898, Pact works at several prisons across England and Wales.

The charity runs a wide variety of services, including: family visitors' centres at prisons, offering information, advice and support to those visiting a prisoner; children's play services inside prison visits halls; 'first night in custody' support for new prisoners; Pact lunch coffee bars at prisons; resettlement projects; and advice desks at courts. Pact also campaigns for more government support for prisoners' families.

== History ==
Pact was established in 2001, as a result of the merger of the Bourne Trust and the Prisoners' Wives and Families Society (PWFS). Between them, the two organisations had 125 years' experience of working with prisoners and their families.

=== Bourne Trust ===
The Bourne Trust started out as the Catholic Prisoners Aid Society. It was established in 1898 by two Catholic lawyers, and the original aim was to help Catholic prisoners – although in practice, help was offered to Catholics and non-Catholics alike.

The Bourne Trust was based in London, but operated nationwide. It helped prisoners in all sorts of ways – for example, finding work for ex-prisoners and providing them with lodgings and food. In 1905, a medical doctor was appointed to see and examine discharged prisoners free of charge. By 1923, the Trust was helping nearly 1,000 prisoners a year – not only by providing practical aid, but also by linking them up with local churches, schools, hospitals and employers.

In 1950, the Bourne Trust set up a scheme to help the families of prisoners. As soon as the person went to prison, their parish priest was contacted to see whether they had a family in need. If so, parish societies were enlisted to offer support and help the family to prepare for the prisoner's return. Spiritual and material help continued after release.

Over the years, the Trust tackled the problems of housing and homelessness with a number of innovative schemes. In 1966, the Trust formed the Hope Housing Association to alleviate the appalling conditions that some prisoners' families were living in. The following year, funds were raised to erect a prefabricated building to accommodate young ex-offenders.

Former logo of the Prison Advice and Care Trust (Pact)

In 1990, the organisation changed its name to the Bourne Trust. This was in honour of Cardinal Bourne, the head of the Catholic Church in England and Wales, who had been the organisation's president from 1903 – 1935.

=== Prisoners Wives and Families Society (PWFS) ===
PWFS was set up in 1975 when a group of prisoners' wives who had been meeting to discuss their problems and support one another decided to launch a self-help organisation. They opened a house near Pentonville Prison which offered a drop-in service and overnight accommodation for people visiting London prisoners.

Founder member Pauline Hoare recalls: "My incentive was to give something back. Because my parents had been so terrific, so supportive, when my own husband went to prison, I had to do something. There was nothing around for prisoners' families and I knew that there were women out there who didn't have a supportive family. PWFS was the first ever self-help organisation for prisoners' families."

PWFS established a telephone helpline, which took up to 3,000 calls a year. In 1994, shocked by the sight of prisoners' wives and children lining up along the prison wall at HMP Pentonville within feet of thundering cars and lorries, PWFS persuaded the prison to give up a small room for use as a visitors' centre.

=== Merger ===
The idea for a merger of the Bourne Trust and PWFS was first floated in 1999. In 2001, the two organisations merged and became the Prison Advice and Care Trust (Pact). Today, Pact works at approx. 70 prisons across England and Wales. Pact's services are open to anyone who needs them, regardless of their faith.

Pact is a member organisation of the Caritas Social Action Network (CSAN).

== Visitors' centres ==
Not every prison has a visitors' centre, and of those that do, some are run by the prison itself and some are run by independent voluntary organisations such as Pact. Pact runs visitors' centres at 14 prisons across the England. The centres are for anyone who is visiting an inmate at that prison, such as prisoners' families, friends, and legal visitors. The aim of Pact visitors' centres is to provide information, support and advice, and a safe, child-friendly environment where people can wait and relax. Their centres are staffed by a combination of paid staff and volunteers.

== Children's play services ==
Pact playworkers (a mixture of staff and volunteers) run children's play areas inside some prison visits halls, providing toys and activities for children visiting a relative inside. The aim of their children's play provision is reduce the feelings of fear and anxiety that can be experienced by children visiting a prison.

== First Night in Custody services ==
In 2001, pact set up a pioneering First Night in Custody project at Holloway Prison, offering one-to-one emotional support to anxious people on their first night in jail. A few years later, the project was expanded to HMP Exeter in Devon and HMP Wandsworth in London.

The aims of the First Night in Custody project are: to reduce the likelihood of new prisoners attempting suicide or self-harming during the first 72 hours; and to reduce the anxiety faced by prisoners and their families. First Night in Custody workers and volunteers sit down one-to-one with new prisoners, listen to their concerns, and often contact relatives on their behalf. They provide practical and emotional support.

In 2007, an independent study conducted by the Prison Reform Trust found that "in the prisons working with pact, people tended to experience fewer difficulties and less frustration in making contact with family than those in the comparison prisons... The specific services that pact provides in liaising with families should be replicated more widely and local prisons may wish to draw on pact's expertise in developing their first night services."

== Basic Caring Communities ==
The Basic Caring Communities scheme is a resettlement programme for ex-offenders. It involves a group of volunteers (often motivated by their faith) who meet regularly with the ex-offender and help him or her making a fresh start in their life. One volunteer calls the ex-offender every day on the phone to discuss how things are going.

== Campaigning ==
In 2007, Pact formed an alliance with the Prison Reform Trust, Action for Prisoners' Families and Clinks to campaign for more help for prisoners' families. A joint Agenda for Action was launched at the House of Lords in December 2007, with 30 recommendations for government, ranging from family-friendly visitors' centres to radically improved prison visits booking lines.

== Well-known supporters ==
The President of the charity is the Archbishop of Westminster, Vincent Nichols, the head of the Catholic Church in England and Wales. Pact's Ambassador is Lord Woolf, former Lord Chief Justice. Former Chief Inspector of Prisons David Ramsbotham, Baron Ramsbotham served as an ambassador until his death in 2022.

== See also ==
- Children of Prisoners Europe
