= The Alabama Solution =

2025 documentary film by Andrew Jarecki and Charlotte Kaufman

- Release poster
- Directed by: Andrew Jarecki; Charlotte Kaufman
- Written by: Andrew Jarecki; Charlotte Kaufman; Page Marsella
- Produced by: Andrew Jarecki; Charlotte Kaufman; Alelur "Alex" Duran; Beth Shelburne
- Starring: Robert Earl Council; Melvin Ray
- Cinematography: Nicholas Kraus
- Edited by: Page Marsella
- Music by: Mark Batson; Chris Hanebutt
- Production company: HBO Documentary Films
- Distributed by: HBO
- Release dates: January 28, 2025 (Sundance); October 10, 2025 (United States)
- Running time: 115 minutes
- Country: United States
- Language: English

The Alabama Solution is a 2025 American documentary film directed by Andrew Jarecki and Charlotte Kaufman. It follows the prison system in Alabama from the perspective of incarcerated leaders.

The film had its world premiere at the 2025 Sundance Film Festival on January 28 and was released by HBO and HBO Max on October 10. At the 98th Academy Awards, it was nominated for Best Documentary.

== Summary ==
In 2019, filmmakers Andrew Jarecki and Charlotte Kaufman visited Easterling Correctional Facility to film a religious revival meeting. During the visit, incarcerated men approached them off-camera with accounts of abuse and systemic failures within the prison system. This began a six-year investigation, during which incarcerated men used contraband cell phones to document conditions and communicate with the filmmakers.

The documentary centers on the death of Steven Davis, an incarcerated man who was beaten to death by prison guards. The film follows Davis's mother, Sandy Ray, as she seeks answers about her son's death. The documentary also profiles incarcerated activists Robert Earl Council and Melvin Ray, who co-founded the Free Alabama Movement and organized protests from within the prison system.

The title refers to a phrase used by Alabama Governor Kay Ivey, who insisted the state could address its prison problems without federal intervention.

== Participants ==
- Robert Earl Council (also known as "Kinetik Justice"), co-founder of the Free Alabama Movement, serving a life sentence for murder
- Melvin Ray (also known as "Bennu Hannibal Ra-Sun"), co-founder of the Free Alabama Movement
- Raoul Poole
- Sandy Ray, Steven Davis's mother

== Release ==
The film premiered at the Sundance Film Festival on January 28, 2025. The film premiered on HBO on October 10, 2025, as well as streaming on HBO Max.

== Production ==
The Alabama Solution was directed by Andrew Jarecki and Charlotte Kaufman. It was produced by Jarecki, Kaufman, Alelur "Alex" Duran, Beth Shelburne, and Page Marsella. Duran, a formerly incarcerated co-producer, contributed to the film's development and investigative approach, drawing from lived experience with the U.S. prison system.

The film was edited by Page Marsella, who also served as a co-producer. Marsella has described the editing process as one requiring careful attention to trust, fear, and the ethical responsibilities of working with footage recorded inside prisons.

Cinematography was led by Nicholas Kraus, whose work incorporated both traditional documentary footage and video recorded by incarcerated individuals using contraband cell phones.

Associate producers on the film included Christopher Izor, Annabelle White, and Gabe Murray. The original score was composed by Mark Batson and Chris Hanebutt.

== Reception ==
The Alabama Solution received widespread critical acclaim upon its release. On the review aggregator website Rotten Tomatoes, the film holds a 100% approval rating based on 31 reviews from critics. On Metacritic, the film has a weighted average score of 90 out of 100, based on 9 critics, indicating "universal acclaim". Matt Brennan of the Los Angeles Times described the film as "one of the most shocking, visceral depictions of our carceral state ever put to film" and "a documentary that should outrage the nation."

Fred Topel of United Press International gave the film a positive review and wrote, "If incarcerated inmates can make progress in activism from inside prison walls, it suggests even greater things are possible when people with more resources join forces. The documentary illuminating the issue is a major step."

Brian Tallerico of RogerEbert.com also gave the film a positive review and wrote that it "will likely play to people who already know about the corruption, brutality, and slave labor that feed our prison system, but it's still important to see the horrors that unfold in this country that so many consider free."

Owen Gleiberman of Variety also gave the film a positive review, calling it "one of the most powerful exposés of the inhumanity of the American prison system I've ever seen. Directed by Andrew Jarecki and Charlotte Kaufman, the movie is a scalding portrait of life on the inside that exerts a grip worthy of a thriller."

Daniel Fienberg of The Hollywood Reporter also gave the film a positive review and wrote that it "is difficult to watch, and impossible to watch without escalating anger. There isn't easy catharsis or an easy non-Alabama solution, but it's impossible to deny that something better must be done."

=== Accolades ===
Award / Film Festival	Year	Category	Recipient(s)	Result	Ref.
Academy Awards	2026	Best Documentary Feature	The Alabama Solution	Nominated	
Critics' Choice Documentary Awards	2025	Best Documentary Feature	The Alabama Solution	Nominated	
Critics' Choice Documentary Awards	2025	Best True Crime Documentary	The Alabama Solution	Nominated	
Critics' Choice Documentary Awards	2025	Best Political Documentary	The Alabama Solution	Won	
Critics' Choice Documentary Awards	2025	Best Director	Andrew Jarecki and Charlotte Kaufman	Nominated	
Critics' Choice Documentary Awards	2025	Best Editing	Page Marsella	Nominated	
International Documentary Association	2025	Best Production	Andrew Jarecki and Charlotte Kaufman	Nominated	
Producers Guild of America Awards	2026	Best Documentary	Andrew Jarecki, Charlotte Kaufman, Alelur "Alex" Duran and Beth Shelburne	Nominated	
Satellite Awards	2026	Best Documentary Film	The Alabama Solution	Nominated	

== Subsequent events ==
Robert Earl Council, Melvin Ray, and Raoul Poole were placed in "extreme" solitary confinement in mid-January 2026. This came after their appearance in the film as well as calling for another prisoner's strike. The following month, the three men filed a federal lawsuit against the Alabama Department of Corrections alleging, among other things, violations of their First Amendment free speech rights relating to their involvement "in protected speech and association through their involvement" with The Alabama Solution.

== See also ==
- Penal labor in the United States
