= Hays State Prison =

Prison in Georgia, United States

Coordinates: 34°30′29″N 85°18′44″W

- Interactive map of Hays State Prison
- Location: 777 Underwood Drive Trion, Georgia
- Capacity: 1683
- Opened: 1990
- Managed by: Georgia Department of Corrections
- Website: www.dcor.state.ga.us/…/S_50000197.html

Hays State Prison is a Georgia Department of Corrections state prison for men located at 777 Underwood Drive in Trion, Chattooga County, Georgia. The facility opened in 1990 and currently has a capacity of 1683 prisoners.

== Conditions ==
Hays State Prison was one of the seven prisons in total that inmates participated in the 2010 Georgia prison strike.

By the Department of Correction's description, Hays manages "some of the state's most challenging offenders". In an eight-week period beginning in December 2012, four inmates were killed in the facility: Derrick Stubbs on December 19, 2012 (although he had been placed in protective custody within the prison); Damion MacClaim on December 26, 2012; Nathaniel Reynolds on January 18, 2013; and Pippa Hall-Jackson on February 5, 2013. Two Hays guards were also injured by stabbings in late January even as the facility was on full security lockdown. In February another guard was stabbed 22 times. In May 2012, a CERT Officer was stabbed twice in the face, and the father of an inmate claimed that he was forced to pay $19,000 ransom to other current Hays prisoners, or else his son would be hurt or killed. Also, the Southern Center for Human Rights lodged a complaint that "prisoners routinely slept in cells to which they were not assigned and they (were) able to move undetected across the prison campus." Most recently on January 17, 2019, inmate Marion Antwan Luke was assaulted and murdered by another inmate. Luke's case is still being investigated by the Georgia Department of Corrections. His maximum release date was set to be released by June 12, 2019. He was scheduled to be released four days before he was assaulted and murdered.

Hays is one of several high-security Georgia state prisons found to have a large percentage of inoperative locks. A September 2012 article reports that auditors found 42% of the locks in Hays either didn't work or could be easily defeated.

In 2015, a prisoner (formerly at Hays) stated that he was raped at the prison and sued three officials of the prison authority. He stated that the prison authority failed to protect him.

== Notable Inmates ==
| Inmate Name | Register Number | Status | Details |
|---|---|---|---|
| Travis McMichael | 1003053360 | Serving a life sentence. | One out of three men convicted in the Murder of Ahmaud Arbery. |
| Guy William Heinze Jr. | 1001191510 | Serving a life sentence. | Convicted of murdering his father and 7 others of his dad's extended family in what is known as the 2009 Glynn County mass murder. |
| Rashad Jamal White | 1002357101 | Serving 18-year sentence | Cult leader convicted of child molestation |
