= 2016 U.S. prison strike =

American prison labor strike

The 2016 U.S. prison strike was a prison work stoppage that began on September 9, 2016, the 45th anniversary of the Attica uprising. The strike occurred in 24 states, and over 24,000 prisoners took part in the strike. The involvement of 24,000 prisoners made this strike the largest ever recorded in the U.S. Within a week, inmates from approximately 20 prisons participated. Organizations involved in coordinating the strike included the Incarcerated Workers Organizing Committee and the Free Alabama Movement.

The issues behind the prison strike included unfair use of prison labor, poor wages, and unsatisfying living conditions. The main goal of the strike was to end constitutional servitude, that is, prison slavery to which inmates are subjected.

Despite the high number of striking prisoners, the strike received little mainstream media coverage.

== Organizations involved ==
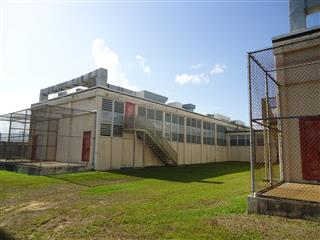
Holman Prison

The Free Alabama Movement and the Incarcerated Workers Organizing Committee actively participated in the prison strike. The strike originated in Alabama within a band of prisoners at Holman Prison. Members of the Free Alabama Movement requested adequately paid labor. The group of inmates used their role as workers as leverage to protest within the prison system.

The main goal of the Incarcerated Workers Organizing Committee is to protest the living conditions inmates endure. The Incarcerated Workers Organizing Committee is associated with the Industrial Workers of the World. Many members of the Industrial Workers of the World are also inmates in prison. Both organizations were part of the prison strike. The Incarcerated Workers Organizing Committee was formed to address injustices in the prison system. On July 31, 2014, the organization's statement of purpose was created in order to organize and unite prisoners.

There are five components to the Incarcerated Workers Organizing Committee's Statement of Purpose, which lay out the goals of the organization, advocate for prisoner solidarity, and advocate for the needs of inmates. Cellular devices were used to organize the groups of strikers.

== Inmates ==
Inmates in 40 to 50 prisons planned to participate in the strike, and over 24,000 inmates were involved. Inmates residing in Alabama, Mississippi, Texas, Oregon, and Georgia participated. Prisoners in Illinois, Virginia, North Carolina, and Washington also contributed to the strike. Protests in South Carolina, Michigan, and Florida occurred as well. The use of concealed cellphones helped to coordinate the strike and unite the strikers. Supporters from outside sources aided in its organization.

Protest actions included the inmates refusing to perform labor and pushing the prisons into a state of lockdown. Orders from a Florida prison were ignored on September 12, 2016, and caused a temporary lockdown. In Michigan, the inmates who worked in the kitchen did not appear at their work posts. Approximately 400 prisoners ignored their tasks and marched. That institution eventually attained a lockdown status after the facility received an impairment. Inmates in South Carolina and Alabama voiced their concerns and requested an end to unfair prison labor, low wages, and poor living conditions.

== Causes ==
While different prison inmates have diverse reasons for striking, the main issues behind the prison strike included unfair use of prison labor, low wages, and unsatisfying living conditions. The labor of the inmates includes maintaining the prison: indoor cleaning, paperwork, cooking, and outdoor maintenance. Inmates are not entitled to any insurance, and prisoners can be forced to work for free, as the 13th Amendment allows unpaid labor in prisons.

From Nixon’s presidency to the present day, much of the increase in both the number and percentage of Americans who are incarcerated can be attributed to the war on drugs. As a result of increased enforcement of 1970s-era drug laws, enhanced sentencing guidelines, and racial profiling, 40 percent of people incarcerated in the United States are now African American. The United States has the highest incarceration rate in the world.

Inmates in 20 or more prisons across the United States participated in the largest prison strike to ever take place, resulting in financial loss for companies that take advantage of absolute minimum wages.

The inmates involved in the strike feel the current prison system is dysfunctional. In prisons in Michigan, inmates receive wages from $0.75 to $3.73 daily. The wage levels caused the inmates to join the strike by participating in a work stoppage. Approximately 40 prisoners were involved. In South Carolina prisons, inmates are “compensated” through the skills they learn on the job, rather than through U.S. currency. One inmate in a South Carolina prison believes the 13th Amendment is the reason for the prisoners’ alleged dehumanization. Approximately 200 prisoners in a South Carolina prison joined the strike to protest the prison’s invocation of the 13th Amendment and the resulting labor and wage conditions.

== 13th Amendment ==
The 13th Amendment was added to the U.S Constitution after the U.S. Civil War. Its stated purpose was to put an end to slavery in America, yet the amendment explicitly includes a provision to permit slavery for persons convicted of a crime. The striking inmates interpreted the 13th Amendment as a reason for their poor wages and living conditions.

Prison systems continue to enforce mandatory work stations that provide few financial advantages for inmates. Prison labor generates an estimated $2 billion per year. The strikers called for increased wages and for a change to the 13th Amendment.

== See also ==
- 2010 Georgia prison strike
- 2018 U.S. prison strike
- Prison strike
- Prisoners' rights
