= Indonesian children in Australian prisons =

Australia controversially convicted as people smugglers Indonesian minors who had been cooks and deckhands on asylum seeker boats from Indonesia to Australia and jailed them in adult prisons. The practice was believed to have come to an end in 2011 but in 2015 allegations were raised of Indonesian minors who remain in adult prisons.

The children's claims to their ages were dismissed by Australian authorities who instead relied on a discredited wrist-bone "age-scan" to determine their age. The children soon became known as the "age-disputes" but they were nevertheless convicted. Whistleblowers and human rights campaigners such as Gerry Georgatos brought their plight to the nation and encouraged journalists such as Walkley awarded Stephen Pennells and the former editor of The Age, Lindsay Murdoch, to publish stories about the children. Georgatos first broke the story through journalist for The West Australian newspaper, Jane Hammond. Lawyers, Terry Fisher, Mark Plunkett, Edwina Lloyd came to the fore and argued to the Courts that were relying on the wrist-bone age scans as the determination of age that indeed they were children.

In mid-2011, after Georgatos and Lloyd hosted a number of forums around the nation and procured the assistance of the Australian Human Rights Commission the majority of the "age-disputes" were released from prison and deported to Indonesia.
