= Penal labor in the United States =

Penal labor in the United States is the practice of using incarcerated individuals to perform various types of work, either for government-run or private industries. Inmates typically engage in tasks such as manufacturing goods, providing services, or working in maintenance roles within prisons.

The 13th Amendment to the U.S. Constitution prohibits slavery and involuntary servitude except as a punishment for a crime where the individual has been convicted. The courts have held that detainees awaiting trial cannot be forced to work. However, convicted criminals who are medically able to work are typically required to do so in roles such as food service, warehouse work, plumbing, painting, or as inmate orderlies. According to the Federal Bureau of Prisons, inmates earn between 12 and 40 cents per hour for these jobs, which is well below the federal minimum wage of $7.25 per hour. There have been proposals of ideas to help incarcerated workers obtain better wages and improved working conditions through unionizing prison labor.

Prison labor in the U.S. generates significant economic output. Incarcerated workers provide services valued at $9 billion annually and produce over $2 billion in goods. The system has undergone many transitions since the late 19th century: the Hawes-Cooper Act of 1929 imposed restrictions on the interstate trade of prison-made goods, and the establishment of the Federal Prison Industries (FPI) in 1934 helped expand prison labor during the Great Depression. In 1979, the Prison Industry Enhancement Certification Program (PIECP) was introduced, allowing inmates to work in private sector jobs. Under this program, inmates can earn market wages, which may be used for taxes, victim compensation, family support, and room and board. The program was approved by Congress in 1990 for indefinite continuation, permitting the transport of prison-made goods across state lines.

Firms in industries such as technology and food have received tax incentives for contracting prison labor, often at lower-than-market rates. The Work Opportunity Tax Credit (WOTC) grants employers $2,400 for every work-release employed inmate. "Prison in-sourcing" has become an alternative to outsourcing work to countries with lower labor costs. Companies such as Whole Foods, McDonald's, Target, IBM, and others have participated in prison in-sourcing beginning in the 1990s and 2000s. Following the January 6 United States Capitol attack, Federal Prison Industries was prioritized for federal purchases of replacement goods, such as office furniture, damaged in the riots.

Penal labor in the United States is controversial. Prison labor extracts more surplus value from the incarcerated individuals, prioritizing profits for corporations and reducing labor costs at the expense of rehabilitation. Supporters of prison labor argue it teaches inmates valuable job skills, reduces recidivism, and helps incarcerated persons reenter society with better prospects.

== History ==
=== Origins ===
The current state of prison labor in the United States has distinct roots in the slavery-era economy and society. The first for-profit prison, and prison to use forced, incarcerated labor, was created in New York State, with the construction of the Auburn Prison completed in 1817. The Auburn Prison contained several factories that used water power from the nearby Owasco River, and prisoners were forced to work in particular workshops assigned to them. The products they created were then sold and used to support the prison, and by the 1820s, "nearly all able-bodied male prisoners were contracted to private companies, which paid the prison," not the prisoners, "for their labor." With the passage of the 13th amendment in 1865, slavery was deemed unconstitutional. Involuntary servitude as a punishment for crime whereof the party shall have been duly convicted, a practice that had already been widely used by the states, was still explicitly allowed.

==== British Empire (1615–1776) ====
The British used parts of North America as a penal colony. Convicts would be transported by private companies and sold by auction to plantation owners. Between 1718 and 1776, it is estimated that 30,000-50,000 convicts were transported for penal labor to at least nine of the continental colonies.

==== Prison labor post-13th amendment (1865–1866) ====
Immediately following the abolition of slavery in the United States (and ratification of the 13th amendment), the slave labor-dependent economy of the South faced widespread poverty and market collapse. Southern lawmakers began to exploit the so-called "loophole" written in the 13th amendment and turned to prison labor as a means of restoring the pre-abolition free labor force. Black Codes were enacted by politicians in the South to maintain white control over former slaves, namely by restricting African Americans' labor activity. Common codes included vagrancy laws that criminalized African Americans' lack of employment or permanent residence. Inability to pay fees for vagrancy crimes resulted in imprisonment, during which prisoners labored in the very same wage-free positions held by slaves less than two years prior. Other "crimes" punishable by imprisonment (and subsequent slave labor) as per Black Codes included unlawful assembly, interracial relationships, violation of slave-like labor contracts, possession of firearms, making or selling liquor, selling agricultural produce without written permission from an employer, and practicing any occupation other than servant or farmer without holding a judge-ordered license. Additionally, orphaned minors and minors removed from their homes by the state were apprenticed by courts to employers until the age of 21. Minors apprenticed under Black Codes were authorized to be forced into labor against their will, and apprentice relationships closely resembled those of master and slave in terms of discipline and involuntary labor. By 1866, nearly all southern states had enacted individual sets of Black Codes. The widespread enforcement of Black Code laws effectively used the 13th amendment's exception of penal labor to reinvent the chattel slavery economy and society to comply with federal law.

==== Prison labor in the Reconstruction era (1866–1877) ====
Between 1866 and 1869, Alabama, Texas, Louisiana, Arkansas, Georgia, Mississippi, and Florida became the first states in the U.S. to lease out convicts. Previously responsible for the housing and feeding of the new prison labor force, the states developed a convict leasing system as a means to rid penitentiaries of the responsibility to care for the incarcerated population. State governments maximized profits by putting the responsibility on the lessee to provide food, clothing, shelter, and medical care for the prisoners. Convict labor strayed from small-scale plantation and share crop harvesting and moved toward work in the private sector. States leased out convicts to private businesses that utilized the low-cost labor to run enterprises such as coal mines, railroads, and logging companies. Private lessees were permitted to use prisoner labor with very little oversight. The result was extremely poor conditions. Inadequacy of necessities like food, water, and shelter, was often exacerbated by unsafe labor practices and inhuman discipline. Nevertheless, the convict lease system prompted the southern economy's return from devastation as the (cheap) labor supply returned to southern capitalism. In 1928, Alabama became the last state in the nation to abolish convict leasing, following Florida by some five years.

While incarceration rates continued to rise during Reconstruction, feeding the convict lease system, Union occupation in the South and national pressure began to change the laws by which African Americans were arbitrarily imprisoned. By 1868, the last official laws of Black Code were repealed in most states. As Reconstruction lost its vigor, however, the Democratic party recovered and de-stigmatized casual racism in the Union-washed South. This end to the reconstruction era set the stage for future reinvention of Black Code laws. States configured legislation to more precisely target the poor, further criminalizing the vast majority of former slaves who had not yet adapted to a free market or accrued wealth. Mississippi's "pig law" followed this trend of hyper criminalization and fed the penal labor force simultaneously by tacking on outrageous sentences to violations. The "pig law" classified theft of a farm animal or any property worth $10 or more as grand larceny. Violation carried a sentence of incarceration up to five years. Following enactment of the "pig law," the incarcerated population quadrupled over the following three years.

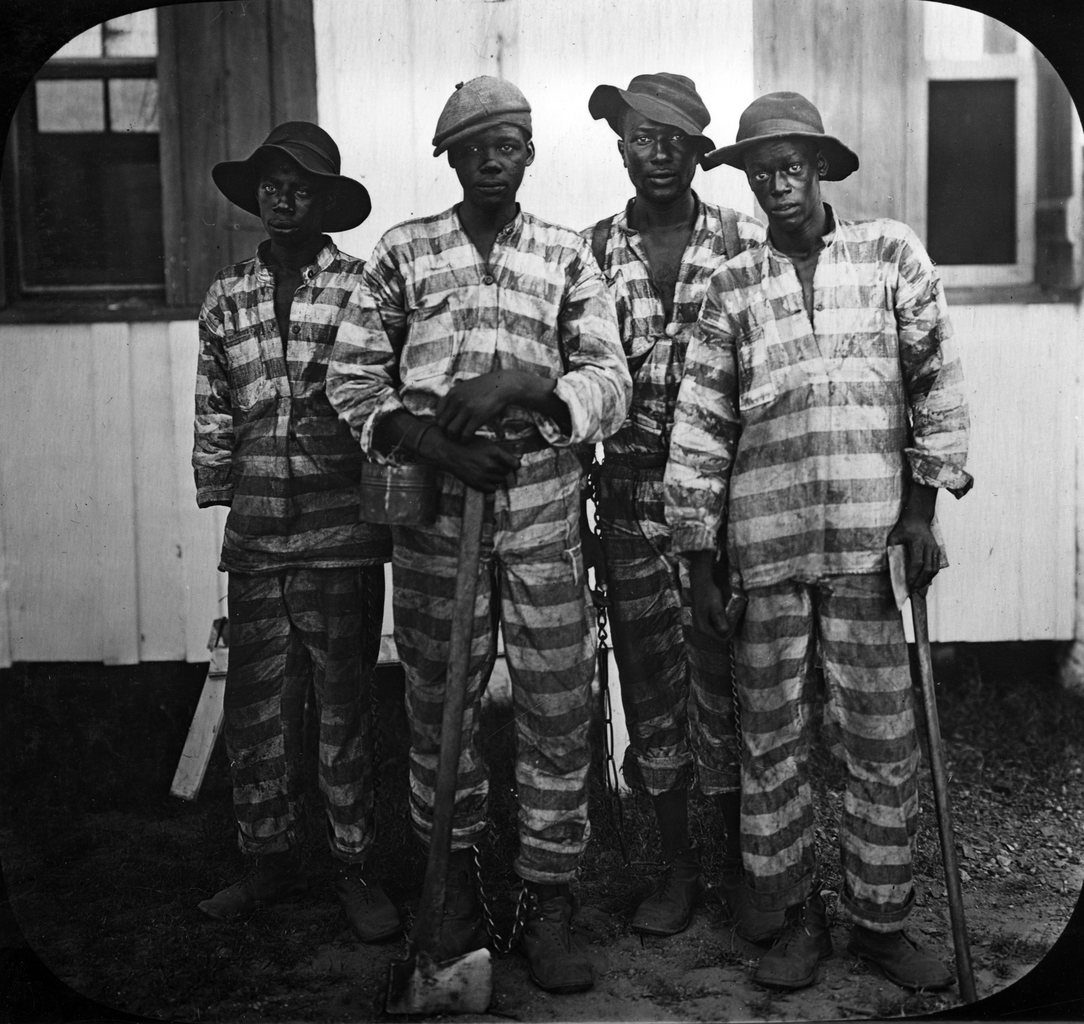
Floridian convicts leased to harvest timber in the mid-1910s

==== Hired convict labor ====
The earliest known law permitting convicts to be paid for their labor traces back to an act passed by New York governor John Jay in 1796. More explicit legislation suggesting that "it may be useful to allow [prisoners] a reasonable portion of the fruits of their labor" was later enacted in 1817 under Daniel D. Tompkins, only to be repealed the following year.

In 1924, the U.S. Secretary of Commerce, Herbert Hoover, held a conference on the "ruinous and unfair competition between prison-made products and free industry and labor" (70 Cong. Rec. S656 (1928)). The eventual legislative response to the committee's report led to federal laws regulating the manufacture, sale and distribution of prison-made products. Congress enacted the Hawes-Cooper Act in 1929, the Ashurst-Sumners Act in 1935 (now known as 18 U.S.C. § 1761(a)), and the Walsh-Healey Act in 1936. Walsh controlled the production of prison-made goods while Ashurst prohibited the distribution of such products in interstate transportation or commerce. Both statutes authorized federal criminal prosecutions for violations of state laws enacted pursuant to the Hawes-Cooper Act. Private companies got involved again in 1979, when Congress passed a law establishing the Prison Industry Enhancement Certification Program which allows employment opportunities for prisoners in some circumstances. PIECP relaxed the restrictions imposed under the Ashurst-Sumners and Walsh-Healey Acts, and allowed for the manufacture, sale and distribution of prisoner-made products across state lines. However, PIECP limited participation in the program to 38 jurisdictions (later increased to 50), and required each to apply to the U.S. Department of Justice for certification.

According to the International Labor Organization, in 2000–2011 wages in American prisons ranged between $0.23 and $1.15 an hour. In California, prisoners earn between $0.30 and $0.95 an hour before deductions.

Over the years, the courts have held inmates may be forced to work and are not protected by the constitution against involuntary servitude. They have also consistently held that inmates have no constitutional right to compensation and that inmates are paid by the "grace of the state." Under the Federal Bureau of Prisons, all able-bodied sentenced prisoners were required to work, except those who participated full-time in education or other treatment programs or who were considered security risks. Correctional standards promulgated by the American Correctional Association provide that sentenced inmates, who are generally housed in maximum, medium, or minimum security prisons, be required to work and be paid for that work. Some states require, as with Arizona, all able-bodied inmates to work.

Laws passed during the era of the New Deal prohibited the use of prison labor with the exception of state institutions. However, lobbying by corporations eventually allowed them to use prison labor by 1979, and by 1995 businesses won exemptions from minimum wage laws which permitted them to exploit prison labor for, according to Elizabeth S. Anderson, "mere pennies an hour." She adds that "many are forced to work in unsafe conditions without protective equipment, because workplace health and safety laws do not apply to prison workers."

Inmates have reported that some private companies, such as Martori Farms, do not check for medical background or age when pulling women for jobs.

== Modern prison labor systems ==
Prison labor in the US is mostly optional. Although inmates are paid for their labor in most states, they usually receive less than $1 per hour. As of 2017, Arkansas, Georgia, and Texas did not pay inmates for any work whether inside the prison (such as custodial work and food services) or in state-owned businesses. Additionally, Alabama, Florida, Mississippi, Oklahoma, and South Carolina allowed unpaid labor for at least some jobs. Incarcerated individuals who are required to work typically receive minimal to no job training resulting in situations where their health and safety could potentially be compromised. Prison workers in the US are generally exempt from workers' rights and occupational safety protections, including when seriously injured or killed. Oftentimes, inmates that are often overworked through penal labor do not receive any proper education or opportunities of "rehabilitation" to maximize profits off the cheap labor produced. Many incarcerated workers also struggle to purchase basic necessities as prices of goods continue to soar, meanwhile prison wages continue to stay the same. For example, "a 10-ounce pouch of beans used to cost $1.21 in September 2021, now costs 1.51," this almost 25% increase can have detrimental effects on what prisoners could afford to buy, leaving many hungry & unable to contact their families from the outside without financially crippling themselves. Despite companies raising the prices of their products in prisons, the profit margins from the same companies have begun to hit record high numbers in overall revenue generated. The company Aramark "reported a $16 billion increase of revenue in 2022, a 35% increase from 2021," showing that these companies that distribute many products to prisons are increasing their prices meanwhile the cost of labor and prison wages stays the same.

=== Alabama ===
Alabama's prison labor system has come under severe scrutiny amid mounting evidence of systemic exploitation and racial inequities. In 1928, Alabama was the last state to outlaw convict leasing. In a 2023 lawsuit, prisoners from the state of Alabama claimed that the state frequently made a practice of denying parole for the sole purpose of maintaining a source of profit, despite policy claiming the contrary. Inmates that refuse to labor face a range of consequences, including solitary confinement and extensions of their sentences.

Investigative investigation by the Associated Press in 2024 revealed that the state has, for decades, established into deals with private companies—including large fast-food chains and automotive suppliers—to employ jailed persons at wages typically well below the federal minimum. Inmates have reported being paid as little as $2 per hour, with large deductions decreasing their actual income to minuscule amounts. In 2025, the documentary The Alabama Solution, containing illicitly filmed footage from inside jails, brought renewed public attention to conditions defined by overcrowding, brutality, substance abuse, and forced labor. Legal advocates believe that the scheme works as a continuation of the post-slavery convict leasing system, disproportionately harming Black offenders. Ongoing federal lawsuits allege violations of constitutional protections and anti-trafficking statutes, naming both the state and participating firms as defendants. Critics have urged for rapid reforms, including independent oversight, the abolition of compelled labor, and equitable reward structures that correspond with human rights and labor standards.

=== Alaska ===
Prisoners in Alaska primarily work either on farms, or in the manufacture of various goods. Alaska notably does not have its own state-owned prisoner industries program, as the state legislature repealed the provision for it in 2005.

At institutions such as the Point Mackenzie Correctional Farm and Wildwood Correctional Complex, inmates—who are not designated as employees—participate in agricultural, maintenance, custodial, and culinary tasks. They allegedly receive compensation ranging from $0.25 to $1.25 per hour, frequently facing disciplinary repercussions for non-participation.

=== Arizona ===
Arizona uses inmates for the manufacture of products under its own state-run industries. Workplace injuries and health issues are common and are generally unrecorded and poorly treated - resulting in many never being able to work again. Prison laborers are not entitled to compensations for injuries sustained.

Hickmans Family Farms is the preeminent private contractor affiliated with Arizona Correctional Industries, a division of the Arizona Department of Corrections, Rehabilitation and Reentry. Since the 1990s, Hickmans has utilized jailed individuals—predominantly women—for egg production. Incarcerated individuals generally receive compensation ranging from $4.25 to $5.25 per hour prior to deductions; however, the net earnings may be less than $1.50 per hour after accounting for expenses related to housing, sustenance, and additional fees. At least nine lawsuits have been initiated by formerly jailed workers claiming significant industrial injuries, including severed fingers and impalement, while employed at Hickmans institutions.

The employment of jail labor in Arizona has elicited condemnation from legal lawyers and civil rights organizations. In 2022, Arizona Department of Corrections Director David Shinn asserted that rural economies in the state would "collapse" without access to inexpensive jailed labor, which can remunerate as little as $0.50 to $1.50 per hour. ACI allegedly imposes the state minimum wage (about $12.90/hour) on private enterprises, maintaining the surplus while remunerating convicts at substantially lower rates. These methods have generated ethical and legal apprehensions over the exploitation of jailed labor for private and governmental gain.

=== Arkansas ===
Arkansas possesses a concerning history of coercive and uncompensated prison work. Inmates, primarily Black, have been compelled to labor on extensive state prison farms, including the Cummins and Tucker Units, located on former slave estates. An investigation by Associated Press in January 2024 disclosed that current Arkansas prison farms provide significant food brands—such as Walmart, Tyson, Cargill, and beef producers—with crops and cattle cultivated by jailed individuals, who are frequently compensated less or not at all. A former inmate recounted receiving merely "two rolls of toilet paper weekly, toothpaste, and a limited number of menstrual pads" in exchange for their labor.

In fiscal year 2019, Arkansas' unpaid jail labor generated over $4.4 million in externally marketed agricultural products, alongside an extra $7.5 million designated for prison food services. Eyewitness testimonies indicate that imprisoned laborers experienced severe mistreatment—disordered working environments, maltreatment, and insufficient safeguards—evoking parallels to historical slavery.

=== California ===
The 2017 Northern California wildfires consumed over 201,000 acres of land and took 42 lives. The state fire agency, California Department of Forestry and Fire Protection (CAL FIRE), mobilized over 11,000 firefighters in response, of which 1,500 were prisoners of minimum security conservation camps overseen by the California Department of Corrections and Rehabilitation. Forty-three conservation camps for adult offenders exist in California and 30 to 40% of CAL FIRE firefighters are inmates from these camps. Inmates within the firefighting programs receive two days off for every day they spend in the conservation camps and receive around US$2 per hour. Most California inmate programs inside of institutions receive a little over $0.25 to $1.25 per hour for labor. The inmate firefighter camps have their origins in the prisoner work camps that built many of the roads across rural and remote areas of California during the early 1900s.

=== Colorado ===
Following the enactment of Colorado Amendment A in 2018, which constitutionally eradicated slavery and involuntary servitude without exception, reports suggest that forced labor persists extensively within the Colorado Department of Corrections. According to DOC rules, all "eligible offenders" are required to engage in labor assignments; noncompliance may lead to disciplinary measures including the forfeiture of privileges, diminished "good time" credits, or potential solitary confinement.

Compensation for prison employment, encompassing agricultural, cooking responsibilities, maintenance, and firefighting, generally varies from $0.13 to $2.00 per hour. Labor is organized as compulsory, with incentives like improved housing or visitation rights dependent on adherence. While the DOC justifies these restrictions as rehabilitative measures and claims they are voluntary, detractors, including jailed inmates and civil rights organizations, see them as coercive practices akin to contemporary slavery.

=== Connecticut ===
Connecticut's prison labor system integrates minimal compensation, mandatory labor, and traditional traditions that attract contemporary scrutiny. Since the mid-20th century, convicts at institutions like Wethersfield State Prison have been mandated to engage in labor under the Auburn system, participating in consistent employment within prison industries (e.g., carpentry, agriculture, cigar production). The inequity has compelled Connecticut to advocate for legislation intended to increase inmate remuneration. In reality, incarcerated prisoners typically earn between $0.30 and $1.50 per hour for institutional labor, such as food, maintenance, and gardening tasks. Inmates who decline assignments in non-pilot programs may encounter disciplinary measures and risk forfeiting privileges or eligibility for release, so compelling participation.

=== Delaware ===
Delaware law (11 Del. C. § 6532) permits the Department of Correction to mandate physically capable offenders to participate in compulsory job, training, and work experience programs. These assignments may encompass work in state-operated industries, public infrastructure projects, or activities such as highway and beach maintenance. Inmates are eligible to compensation—either through salary or good-time credits—with overtime remuneration at 1.5 times the basic rate for work exceeding 40 hours per week. Deductions for lodging, meals, restitution, and additional expenses can substantially diminish net income.

In Delaware, jailed workers generally receive compensation ranging from $0.25 to $2.00 per hour, a wage structure that has remained unchanged for decades. Delaware allows institutionalized low-wage inmate labor, however there have been no significant litigation contesting the practice as unconstitutional forced labor.

=== Florida ===
Inmates in Florida are forced to perform labor, often under threat of solitary confinement and beatings. These inmates are not paid for the labor they're made to perform, and unsatisfactory performance can also lead to solitary confinement. In one instance, a prisoner working as a barber was sent to solitary for dropping and breaking a hair clipper. In 2019, a prisoner at the women's Lowell Correctional Institution in Marion County was left paralyzed after being beaten for refusing to clean a set of toilets during a mental breakdown. The state settled in court for $4.65 million.

In Florida, compulsory prison labor is widespread in 128 state prisons and 20 work camps, affecting around 80,000 jailed persons.

=== Georgia ===
Pat Biegler, director of the Georgia Public Works department stated that the prison labor system implemented in Georgia facilities saves the department around US$140,000 per week. The largest county prison work camp in Columbus, Georgia, Muscogee County Prison, saves the city around $17 to US$20 million annually according to officials, with local entities also benefiting from the monetary funds the program receives from the state of Georgia. According to Prison Warden of Muscogee County Prison, Dwight Hamrick, the top priority is to provide prison labor to Columbus Consolidated Government and to rehabilitate inmates, with all inmates being required to work. Inmates performing tasks related to sanitation, golf courses, recycling, and landfills receive a monetary compensation of around US$3 per day, while those in jobs such as facility maintenance, transportation, and street beautification do not receive any compensation.

=== Louisiana ===
Louisiana state law requires that all prisoners serving a felony sentence must work while in prison. The inmates may be compensated, or they may not, but if they are the compensation shall be no more than one dollar an hour. Those who are assigned to work outside the prison, such as serving food or cleaning floors at the Louisiana State Capitol, are forbidden from receiving any form of pay. Many prisoners are forced to work on for-profit plantations, including picking cotton. Refusal to work can be met with solitary confinement and other punishments.

Louisiana's extensive Angola prison, referred to as the "Alcatraz of the South," occupies 18,000 acres of a former slave estate and houses roughly 3,800 convicts, with over 65% being Black, subjected to arduous agricultural labor. Incarcerated individuals generally commence with 90 days of compulsory labor in the field, frequently utilizing hoes and shovels under the supervision of armed guards and "line pushers". Compensation is alarmingly inadequate: $0.02 to $0.40 per hour, with agricultural labor in Angola yielding as little as 2 cents per hour. Refusal to labor may lead to solitary confinement, deprivation of privileges, or involuntary transfers, while numerous lawsuits have been initiated claiming cruel and unusual punishment and breaches of the Americans with Disabilities Act due to the refusal of amenities and exposure to high temperatures.

The prison labor system goes beyond Angola into state enterprises, where jailed individuals manufacture office furniture, mattresses, uniforms, and agricultural products. A substantial portion of these goods enters commercial supply chains, yielding over $2 billion annually nationwide, with Louisiana making a considerable contribution. The ACLU and University of Chicago data indicate that vocational and maintenance roles compensate between $0.04 and $0.80 per hour, with certain offenders receiving no remuneration during their initial years of service. Former detainees and advocates characterize the institution as contemporary slavery, drawing obvious comparisons between Angola's operations and its plantation history.

=== Mississippi ===
Forced labor exists in many prisons. In Mississippi, Parchman Farm has operated as a for-profit plantation, which yields revenues for the state from its earliest years. Many prisoners were used to clear the dense growth in the Mississippi bottomland, and then to cultivate the land for agriculture. By the mid-20th century, it had 21,000 acres (8,500 ha) under cultivation. In the late 20th century, prison conditions were investigated under civil rights laws, when abuses of prisoners and harsh working conditions were exposed. These revelations during the 1970s led the state to declare that it would abandon the for-profit aspect of its forced labor from convicts and planned to hire a professional penologist to head the prison. A state commission recommended reducing the size of acreage, to grow only what is needed for the prison. However, an investigation in 2024 by the Associated Press found that Parchman Farm remained one of the largest for-profit plantations in the country.

=== New York (state) ===
The New York Department of Corrections' prison labor division Corcraft holds a partial monopoly on all goods purchased by state agencies - in which if the requisite item or a sufficiently similar item is available from Corcraft, it must be purchased from Corcraft. The jobs inmates are mandated to work range from mundane ones such as tailoring and taxi driving, to more hazardous ones as lead paint and asbestos removal. The average Corcraft inmate wage is 65 cents an hour, or about $1,092 per inmate per year. The lowest Corcraft wage is 16 cents per hour, though some can earn bonuses equal to $1.14 per hour.

=== South Carolina ===
The prison labor system in South Carolina has faced significant condemnation for sustaining conditions reminiscent of contemporary slavery. Incarcerated individuals, predominantly Black men serving lengthy sentences, are mandated to engage in manufacturing, maintenance, and public service for remuneration ranging from $0 to $2 per hour, frequently without the option to decline. Although entrepreneurship programs assert they provide market-rate salaries ($7.25–$10/hour), deductions for lodging, board, taxes, and restitution often reduce actual earnings to below $1.25/hour. Legal attempts to contest this exploitation have proven mostly futile: in Torrence v. SCDC, the court determined that convicts lack the standing to uphold wage protections, so depriving them of labor rights granted to all other employees. This legal vacuum perpetuates a system wherein the state directly benefits from coerced work while depriving jailed individuals of the capacity to self-advocate.

Internal resistance has been increasing. South Carolina was instrumental in the 2016 national prison strike, during which jailed individuals organized hunger strikes and work stoppages at prisons such as Lee and Perry Correctional Institutions. The requests for the cessation of forced labor, equitable remuneration, and humane treatment were predominantly disregarded by officials, who persist in exploiting prison labor under the pretense of rehabilitation. Recent litigation, including a case initiated by Tyger River convicts against Shaw Industries, exposes a deliberate pattern of pay theft disguised as lawful deductions. These behaviors exemplify a carceral economy founded not on justice or reform, but on compelled labor, systemic maltreatment, and racialized domination.

=== Texas ===
Responsible for the largest prison population in the United States (over 140,000 inmates) the Texas Department of Criminal Justice is known to make extensive use of unpaid prison labor. Prisoners are engaged in various forms of labor with tasks ranging from agriculture and animal husbandry, to manufacturing soap and clothing items. The inmates receive no salary or monetary remuneration for their labor, but receive other rewards, such as time credits, which could work towards cutting down a prison sentence and allow for early release under mandatory supervision. Prisoners are allotted to work up to 12 hours per day. The penal labor system, managed by Texas Correctional Industries, was valued at US$88.9 million in 2014. The Texas Department of Criminal Justice states that the prisoner's free labor pays for room and board while the work they perform in prison equips inmates with the skills and experience necessary to gain and maintain employment after they are released. Texas is one of the four states in the United States that does not pay inmates for their labor in monetary funds, with the other states being Georgia, Arkansas, and Alabama.

=== Federal Prison Industries ===
In 2007, Federal Prison Industries reportedly paid inmates from US$0.23 per hour up to a maximum of US$1.15 per hour to produce various goods, including furniture, body armor, and combat helmets. Private prisons have engaged in the practice of providing cheap, dangerous labor at low costs, resulting in improper safety & health standards to maximize profits. Private prisons are maintained as an institution to profit from, resulting in the incentive to mass incarcerate more individuals to further grow the prison labor market, in return to generate as much revenue as possible. In the aftermath of the 2021 storming of the United States Capitol, it was noted that FPI would receive priority when the federal government purchases products such as office furniture to replace what was damaged in the riots.

== Prison labor legislation ==
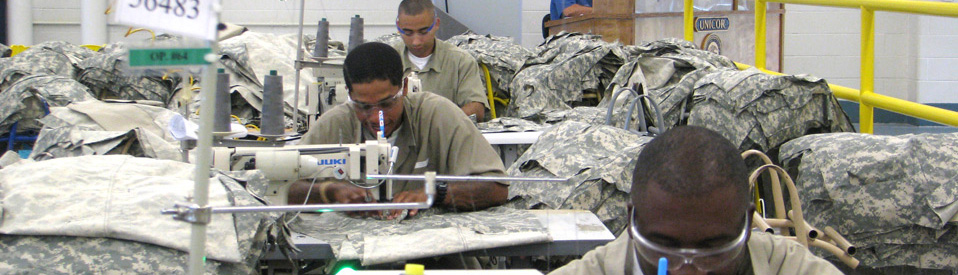
Prison labor in a UNICOR (Federal Prison Industries) program

Federal Prison Industries (UNICOR or FPI) is a wholly owned United States government corporation created in 1934 that uses penal labor from the Federal Bureau of Prisons (BOP) to produce goods and services. FPI is restricted to selling its products and services to federal government agencies, with some recent exceptions.

The Prison Industry Enhancement Certification Program (PIECP) is a federal program which was initiated along with the American Legislative Exchange Council (ALEC) and the Prison-Industries Act in 1979. Before these programs, prison labor for the private sector had been outlawed for decades to avoid competition. The introduction of prison labor in the private sector, the implementation of PIECP, ALEC, and Prison-Industries Act in state prisons all contributed a substantial role in cultivating the prison-industrial complex. Between the years 1980 through 1994, prison industry profits jumped substantially from $392 million to $1.31 billion.

The Prison-Industries Act allowed third-party companies to buy prison manufactured goods from prison factories and sell the products locally or ship them across state lines. Through the PIECP program, there were "thirty jurisdictions with active [PIE] operations" across 27 states.

== Response ==
=== Free Alabama Movement ===
Three prisoners – Melvin Ray, James Pleasant and Robert Earl Council – who led work stoppages in Alabama prisons in January 2014 as part of the Free Alabama Movement have been in solitary confinement since the start of the labor strike. Protests took place in three Alabama prisons, and the movement has smuggled out videos and pictures of abusive conditions. Authorities say the men will remain in solitary confinement indefinitely. The prisoners' work stoppages and refusal to cooperate with authorities in Alabama are modeled on actions that took place in the Georgia prison system in December 2010. The strike leaders argue that refusing to work is a tactic that would force prison authorities to hire compensated labor or to induce the prisoners to return to their jobs by paying a fair wage. Prisoners appear to be currently organizing in Arizona, California, Florida, Illinois, Ohio, Pennsylvania, Mississippi, Texas, Virginia and Washington.

Council, one of the founders of the Free Alabama Movement, said: "We will not work for free anymore. All the work in prisons, from cleaning to cutting grass to working in the kitchen, is done by inmate labor. [Almost no prisoner] in Alabama is paid. Without us the prisons, which are slave empires, cannot function. Prisons, at the same time, charge us a variety of fees, such as for our identification cards or wrist bracelets, and [impose] numerous fines, especially for possession of contraband. They charge us high phone and commissary prices. Prisons each year are taking larger and larger sums of money from the inmates and their families. The state gets from us millions of dollars in free labor and then imposes fees and fines. You have [prisoners] that work in kitchens 12 to 15 hours a day and have done this for years and have never been paid."

Ray said "We do not believe in the political process ... We are not looking to politicians to submit reform bills. We aren't giving more money to lawyers. We don't believe in the courts. We will rely only on protests inside and outside of prisons and on targeting the corporations that exploit prison labor and finance the school-to-prison pipeline. We have focused our first boycott on McDonald's. McDonald's uses prisoners to process beef for patties and package bread, milk, chicken products. We have called for a national Stop Campaign against McDonald's. We have identified this corporation to expose all the others. There are too many corporations exploiting prison labor to try and take them all on at once."

=== Critics ===
Executive Director of the Alliance for American Manufacturing, Scott Paul stated that "It's bad enough that our companies have to compete with exploited and forced labor in China. They shouldn't have to compete against prison labor here at home. The goal should be for other nations to aspire to the quality of life that Americans enjoy, not to discard our efforts through a downward competitive spiral."

Associate Editor of Prison Legal News, Alex Friedmann regards the prison labor system in the United States as part of a "confluence of similar interests" among corporations and politicians referring to the rise of a prison–industrial complex. He stated, "This has been ongoing for decades, with prison privatization contributing to the escalation of incarceration rates in the US."

An analysis of the International Trade Union Confederation's report indicates that the United States has not effectively adhered to the labor conventions it has ratified, thereby failing to realize its commitments to the protection of workers' rights.

=== Inmate strikes ===
From 2010 to 2015 and again in 2016 and 2018, some prisoners in the US refused to work, protesting for better pay, better conditions and for the end of forced labor. Strike leaders have been punished with solitary confinement.

The prison strikes of 2018, sponsored by Jailhouse Lawyers Speak and the Incarcerated Workers Organizing Committee (the latter a branch of the labor group Industrial Workers of the World) is considered by some observers the largest in the country's history. In particular, inmates objected to being excluded from the 13th amendment which forces them to work for pennies a day, a condition they assert is "modern-day slavery."

== Alternative policies and reform ==
=== Prison labor contracts ===
In an effort to help inmates obtain employment post-release, legal scholars have argued that states should require in their contracts with private employers that the employer cannot have a policy that prohibits employing former prison inmates after they have been released.

=== Unionizing prison labor ===
Labor unions represent workers in their respective industries to negotiate terms regarding wages, employment standards, benefits, and any applicable workplace conditions and policies. Currently, in the United States, incarcerated workers do not have the constitutional right to unionize under applicable labor laws. The Fair Labor Standards Act establishes the standard that dictates minimum wage, overtime pay, and enforces strict restrictions on youth employment. These standards from the Fair Labor Standards Act (FLSA) exempt incarcerated workers from reaping the benefits as they are not recognized as "protected workers" by the federal government. In the United States, prison workers oftentimes earn roughly $0.13 to $1.30 per hour depending on whether the work is classified as a "non-industrial" or "industrial" occupation. This exclusion of the legal right to organize a union creates an exploitative, dangerous environment in prisons, leaving many incarcerated workers in low wage, oppressive work conditions.

The unionization of prison labor has become a difficult task due to the unanswered question of whether incarcerated workers could possess the right to unionize & collective bargaining under the National Labor Relations Act of 1935 (NLRA). The National Labor Relations Board (NLRB) generally excludes government employees, meaning that many incarcerated workers aren't recognized as "employees" under the NLRA.

==== History ====
After the events of the Second World War, prison strikes became commonplace with the spike of prison labor protests to settle their disagreements with the grueling labor. Due to the overwhelming amount of strikes ongoing, many prison officials began to discuss the efficacy of prison labor & how to compromise with the demands. In 1968, after the waves of protests, the North Carolina Prisoner's Labor Union (NCPLU) came to fruitition. During this time, many prisoners began to fight for union recognition, also creating the United Prisoners Union (UPU), under the slogan, "Power to the Convicted Class," encouraging more than 1,800 prisoners to have signed authorization cards for a UPU membership.

During the 1960s-1970s, incarcerated workers began to protest for the recognition of prison unions through strikes. In 1970, the National Prisoner's Reform Association (NPRA) was established as a successful prison labor organization that influenced other state prisons also to build prisoner-formed unions to establish collective bargaining relationships with the prisons. Many of these "protest strikes" generally were popularized in national news, mainly surrounding the issues of prison wages & not being able to afford basic necessities to dehumanizing work conditions.

Although these strikes took place to address issues regarding prison labor conditions, many of the efforts of incarcerated workers deteriorated due to the public's view of the topic. Many of the incidents were framed as violent uprisings, using the Attica Prison riot as an example, which was one of the deadliest prison uprisings (43 total fatalities) due to a fallout of negotiations of prisoners' demands. These specific events stifled the progress of prison unions due to the generalizations of grouping violent uprisings with prisoners bargaining for better wages & better working conditions Many of these attempts to achieve broad unionization of prison labor became unobtainable due to prisons' complete unwillingness to compromise with inmates.

===== The "Right to Dignity" =====
The "right to dignity" or "human dignity" is mentioned throughout the American legal framework and is "expected" to be a constitutional right but is often vague and lacks proper definition. Such cases as Brown v. Plata, Davis v. Ayala, and Obergefell v. Hodges, built a basis for determining the constitutional right of dignity. This right of dignity extends to the Eighth Amendment of the Constitution, cruel and unusual punishment, thus can be used in the context of prison labor in recognizing the right to dignity for prisoners. This focus on dignity could provide a more expansive overview of examining prison work conditions, expanding to a broader lens like unionizing.

==== Benefits ====
Scholars argue that the unionization of prison labor could protect incarcerated workers from the dehumanizing and dangerous conditions of prison employment while protecting their "right to dignity." The right to unionize protects prisoners' "dignity" by fighting for benefits that include higher wages, secure & safe work sites through collective bargaining. Incarcerated workers can also gain a sense of identity and social unity by participating in their respected union which could further help improve the effects of reintegrating back into society after being released. Being able to ensure that prisoners could obtain jobs that could cultivate helpful real-world skills could be extremely beneficial, leading to higher chances of obtaining employment & lower reentry rates after imprisonment. Unions could also pave the way for successful rehabilitative factors such as building communities within the workplace & giving inmates a sense of belonging which could provide positive outcomes, ensuring rehabilitation.

== See also ==
- 13th – Netflix documentary by Ava DuVernay which includes discussion of prison labor
- Labor camp
- Penal labor exception
- Prison farm
- Incarceration in the United States
- Prison–industrial complex
- Incarcerated firefighters
