= Children of Prisoners Europe =

Pan-European advocacy organization

- Children of Prisoners Europe logo
- Founded: 2000
- Type: NGO
- Location: Montrouge
- Method: Advocacy, research, support interventions by member organisations
- Website: www.childrenofprisoners.eu

Children of Prisoners Europe (COPE) (formerly European Action Research Committee for Children of Imprisoned Parents or EUROCHIPS) is a pan-European network acting to support children with imprisoned parents.

== History ==
Within the European Union, some 1 million children are separated from their parents each year due to parental incarceration. The organisation began in 1993 under the name European Action Research Committee on Children of Imprisoned Parents (EUROCHIPS) thanks to the combined efforts of Alain Bouregba of Relais Enfants-Parents and the Bernard van Leer Foundation. EUROCHIPS was set up as an exploratory body to develop a consensus on integrated good practice schemes, promote quality good practice norms, foster the exchange of ideas and information, enhance the competence of professionals working in the field of parental incarceration and raise awareness among decision-makers and the general public in Europe. Its work is firmly grounded in a child's rights perspective based on the UN Convention of the Rights of the Child, in particular children's rights to maintain direct contact with a parent in prison when in their best interest.

EUROCHIPS was formalised as an association in 2000 by Relais Enfants-Parents, Save the Children and Relais Enfants-Parents Belgium under the name European Committee for Children of Imprisoned Parents. With continued funding from the Bernard van Leer Foundation, EUROCHIPS organised awareness-raising events and participated in research projects to promote the spread of knowledge relating to children with imprisoned parents.

In 2013, EUROCHIPS received an Operating Grant from the European Commission and its name changed to Children of Prisoners Europe (COPE). With the ongoing support of the European Commission and the Bernard van Leer Foundation, the organisation continues to work under its new name to protect the rights and needs of children with imprisoned parents in Europe and beyond, in tandem with its members and affiliates.

== Mission ==
Children of Prisoners Europe’s mission is to safeguard the social, political and judicial inclusion of children with an imprisoned parent, while fostering the pursuit and exchange of knowledge which enhances good practices, and contributes to a better understanding of the psychological, emotional and social development of these children. It aims to put children at the heart of policy making.

COPE’s vision is that every child be guaranteed fair, unbiased treatment, protection of his or her rights, and equal opportunities regardless of social, economic or cultural heritage. This organisation is the only pan-European network working exclusively on behalf of these children.

== Operations ==
Children of Prisoners Europe headquarters are in Montrouge, France. The executive director of Children of Prisoners Europe is Liz Ayre. COPE is a membership-based organisation with members and affiliates from 23 countries worldwide. Policy developments in 2015 included initiating a Written Question for the European Commission on children of prisoners (JHA/2008/909) with MEP Jean Lambert—which received a Written Answer from the Commission—and ensuring that children of prisoners were included as part of the group of vulnerable children in the Council of Europe’s child rights strategy 2016-2021.

== Activities ==
Children of Prisoners Europe and its network of organisations work to influence policies related to children’s rights and to foster the exchange of good practice by identifying problems; highlighting children’s rights and needs; articulating positive solutions and strategies; and spearheading further collective action across Europe and beyond. To achieve its mission, Children of Prisoners Europe partakes in the following activities:

- Boosting public awareness of children of prisoners by sensitising judges, schools, childcare professionals, prison staff and relevant organisations and administrations on the rights and specific needs of children with incarcerated parents.
- Organising an annual European conference on innovative topics concerning children affected by parental incarceration, as well as other forums to foster the exchange of ideas and good practice.
- Building a resource centre to provide more accurate data on the number of children affected, to explore the psychological and social impact of a parent’s incarceration and to highlight the importance of maintaining family ties.
- Training professionals, practitioners, prison staff, police, schools, volunteers.
- Hosting an annual awareness-raising campaign targeted at policymakers and members of European Parliament to call attention to rights and needs of children with incarcerated parents.
- Strengthening the commitment at European and international levels to address the needs of children of prisoners through advocacy work with the European Parliament, European Commission, Council of Europe and UN bodies.
- Replicating good practice initiatives across Europe such as the 2014 Memorandum of Understanding signed in Italy by member Bambinisenzasbarre, the Italian Justice Ministry and the Italian Ombudsman for Childhood and Adolescence.
- Publishing a biannual journal providing in-depth contributions by leading scholars and professionals on key issues for children affected by parental incarceration

Based on the research collected and work done, Children of Prisoners Europe promotes various initiatives that benefit the lives of these children, such as: child-friendly prison visits and visiting areas, increased communication access between children and their parents, special training for professionals and volunteers who work with children, parent support initiatives, and measures that better allow parents to exercise their parental responsibilities.

== Members ==
Children of Prisoners Europe works with a network of organisations and persons that have similar missions to be the most productive in providing help for children with imprisoned parents.

Member Organisations	Individual Members	Applicants	Affiliates
ASBL Relais Enfants Parents Belgique	Marylène Delhaxhe	SAVN	Maggie Ross
Ombudsman for Children, Croatia	Maja Šupljika	Hoppenbank	George Busuttil
Czech Helsinki Committee	Henriette Heimgartner	Exodus NL	Georgia Parry
Relais Enfants Parents (REP)	Klaus Roggenthin	Alternative Sociale	Angus Mulready-Jones
La Féderation des Relais Enfants Parents (FREP)	Austin Treacy	RODA	Annetta Bennett
Treffpunkt e.V.	Paul Murphy	Partners of Prisoners (POPS)	BAG-S e.V.
Bedford Row	Marie-Jeanne Schmitt		Barnardos Northern Ireland
St. Nicholas Trust	Ria Wolleswinkel		Bedřiška Kopoldova
Bambinisenzasbarre	Barbara Malherbe		Bill Muth
Service Treffpunkt	Una Convery		Children Heard and Seen
For Fangers Pårørende (FFP)	Linda Moore		Christine Andrews
Solrosen	Lucy Gampell		Bahiyyah Muhammad
Bufff	Kate Philbrick		Freedom Gate
Relais Enfants Parents Romands (REPR)	Oliver Robertson		Heather Ball
Prison Advice & Care Trust (PACT)			Heilsarmee Gefängnisdienst
NIACRO			Helene Oldrup
Families Outside			Heves County Penitentiary Institute
Quakers United Nations Office (QUNO)			IFAN Brazil
Action for Prisoners' Families (APF)			Irish Penal Reform Trust (IPRT)
			Lucy Baldwin
			Mandy Gusha
			Marian Quinn
			Mona Kassarp
			Morning Tears Deutschland
			Norm Reed
			Person Shaped Support
			Pillars
			Probation Foundation (KRITS)
			Rachel Brett
			Relais Enfants Parents Haute-Normandie (REPHN)
			Scottish Families Affected by Alcohol & Drugs
			Service Network for Children of Inmates
			SEUM Child Welfare
			Shona Minson
			Sinead O'Malley
			Storybook Dads
			Syed Aoun Abbas Sharazy
			The Croft (Visitors' Support and Advice Centre, HMP Barlinnie)
			Timo Jattu
			Vicky Saunders
			Yvette Harris

== See also ==
- Children's Ombudsman
- Prison Advice and Care Trust
