= San Francisco Bay Area Independent Media Center =

The San Francisco Bay Area Independent Media Center, commonly known as Indybay, is the San Francisco Bay Area branch of the Independent Media Center, an all-volunteer organization which operates a community news website, Indybay.org, and in June 2004, began publishing a free news magazine, Fault Lines.

== Foundation ==
Indybay was established in early 2000; the domain name was registered on March 23, 2000; and by August 23, 2000, the website was online and functional.

Fault Lines

Fault Lines is a free news magazine published by Indybay. It is produced and distributed by an all-volunteer collective. The first issue was published in June 2004.

== Focus ==
Indybay was initially closely tied to Media Alliance, a San Francisco-based media resource and advocacy center for media workers, non-profit organizations, and social justice activists. One early Indybay project was a page exposing bad landlords. Another event that helped pull in many early Indybay volunteers was the National Association of Broadcasters (NAB) Conference that took place in September 2000 in San Francisco. Indybay soon broadened its coverage. Local labor struggles, forest activism in Northern California and police brutality were quickly a focus of the early site. After 2001, Indybay developed more of a focus on antiwar protests and immigration issues. In 2002 new pages were added focusing on LGBT issues, Women's Rights, Local Electoral Issues and specific international conflicts.

Animal Liberation was added as a page a year later. In 2004 Regional Pages were added and the Central Valley became a page partly run by its own collective. Santa Cruz Independent Media Center started as its own separate site, but regionally integrated with Indybay in January 2006 as an autonomous page run by its own collective. Local reporters regularly post from the South Bay, the North Bay and the North Coast.
