= 2010 Evin prison hunger strike =

16-day protest by Iranian prison inmates

On July 26, 2010, seventeen prisoners from Ward 350 of Evin prison, Iran, executed a 16-day hunger strike to protest solitary confinement, as well as the poor living conditions within the prison. This included the lack of necessary medical treatment, arbitrary detention, denial of access to legal counsel, suspension of visitation privileges and abuse from prison guards. Subsequent to the hunger strike, authorities placed the seventeen prisoners in solitary confinement in Ward 240, while also prohibiting them from making phone calls, visiting their families, or contacting their lawyers. Overall, the action did not achieve its objectives of improving conditions within the prison or gaining access to legal counsel. However, one of the prisoners on strike, Babak Bordbar, was released for unknown reasons on August 10.

== Background ==
On June 12, 2009, Mahmoud Ahmadinejad was re-elected as President of the Islamic Republic of Iran, with 62% of the vote. Large irregularities in these results, including a voter turnout of over 100% in both provinces of Mazandaran and Yazd, led many people to affirm that the election was both fraudulent and undemocratic. This event led to several protests resulting in hundreds of arrests, casualties and deaths; while also triggering the Iranian Green Movement, a political campaign defined by peace and democracy that demanded the removal of Mahmoud Ahmadinejad from office. Within a few days of protest and unrest, thousands of opposition groups and reformist politicians were sent to Evin, a political prison known for its generational populations of activists, journalists and human rights defenders.

=== Time period ===
July 26, 2010 – August 11, 2010

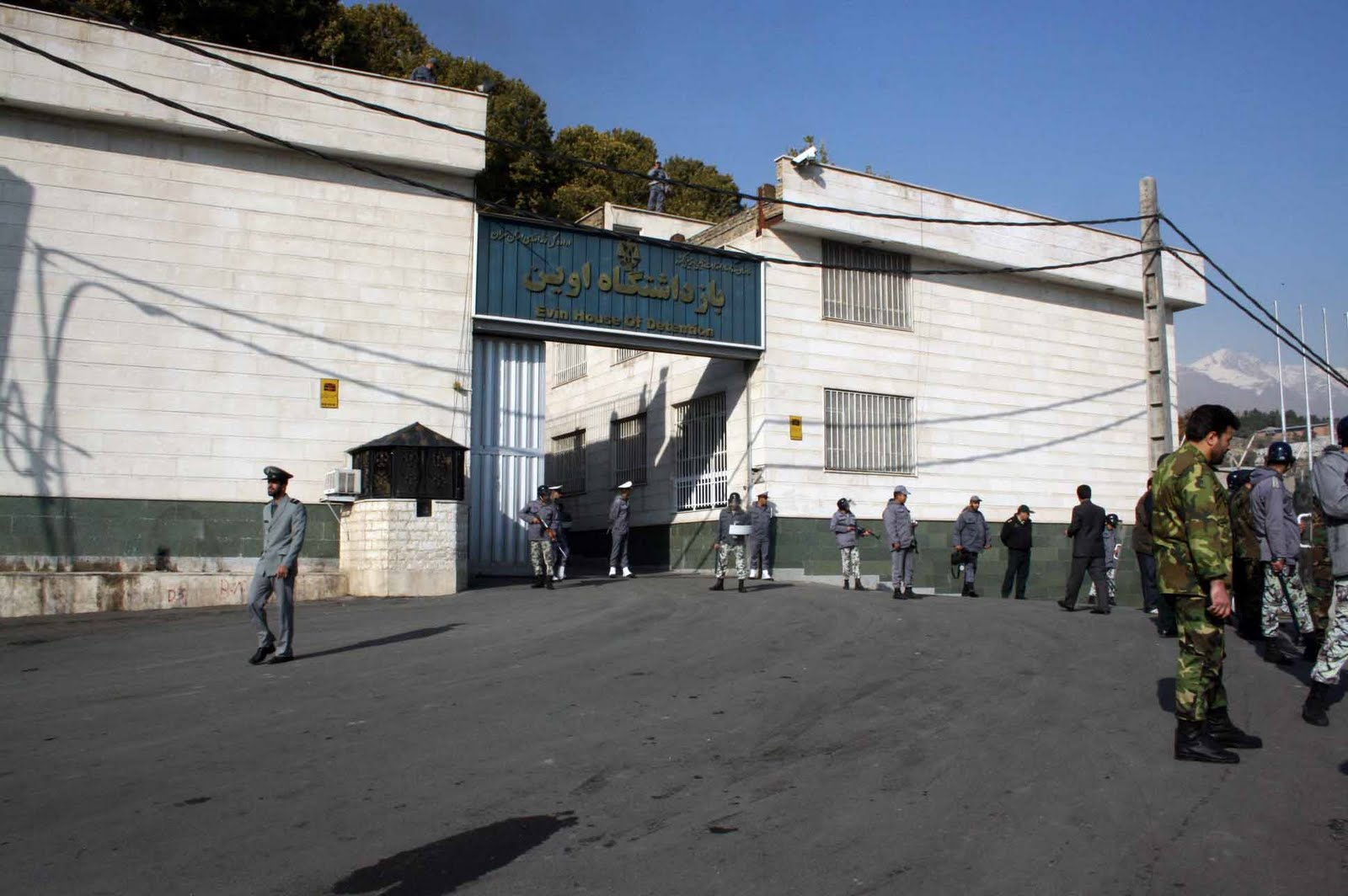
Evin House of Detention, located in Evin, Northwestern Tehran

=== Location ===
Evin Prison, Northwestern Tehran, Iran

=== Action(s) ===
Fast (dry and wet), petition, march

=== Hunger strike ===
On July 26, 2010, seventeen prisoners from Ward 350 of Evin prison executed a 16-day hunger strike to protest solitary confinement as well as the poor living conditions within the prison, including lack of necessary medical treatment, arbitrary detention, denial of access to legal counsel, suspension of visitation privileges and abuse from prison guards These seventeen prisoners included:

- Bahman Ahmadi Amoui
- Gholam Hossein Arshi
- Ebrahim Babei
- Babak Bordbar
- Majid Darri
- Jafar Eghdami
- Koohyar Goodarzi
- Peyman Karimi-Azad
- Ali Malihi
- Abdollah Momeni
- Hamid Reze Mohammadi
- Zia Navabi
- Hossein Nouraninejad
- Ali Parviz
- Keyvan Samimi
- Mohammad Hossein Sohrabirad
- Majid Tavakoli

==== Response ====
Subsequent to the hunger strike, authorities placed the seventeen prisoners in solitary confinement in Ward 240, while also prohibiting them from making phone calls, visiting their families, or contacting their lawyers.

== Timeline ==
On August 2, 2010, relatives of the prisoners attempted to visit Evin, but were forced to leave the premises by authorities.

On August 4, 2010, family members of the 17 prisoners organized a march to the office of Jeafari Dolatabadi, the Tehran General Prosecutor and demanded their relatives' release from solitary confinement.

On that same day, three of the 17 prisoners went from a wet hunger strike to a dry hunger strike, thus refusing to consume both solids and liquids.

On August 7, 2010, prison authorities released Babak Bordbar, one of the 17 political prisoners on strike.

On August 8, the father of one of the hunger strikers, Ali Parviz, was arrested for submitting a letter to the Iranian judiciary on behalf of the political prisoners imploring for improved treatment.

On August 11, 15 of the prisoners ended their hunger strikes and released a statement specifying that they annulled their hunger strike out of respect to the leaders of the Green Revolution who urged them to cease their fasting to "provide movement leadership".

After the hunger strike ended, prisoners were forced into solitary confinement for an indefinite time period by prison authorities. Though Iranian law only allows a maximum of 20 days in solitary confinement, five out of the 17 prisoners were threatened with an increased sentence of 6 months. As of today, the majority of the 17 prisoners remain imprisoned in Evin, while a few were transferred to Rajaeeshahr prison on August 15.

On 20 December 2018, Human Rights Watch urged the regime in Iran to investigate and find an explanation for the death of Vahid Sayadi Nasiri who had been jailed for insulting the Supreme Leader Ali Khamenei. According to his family Nasiri had been on hunger strike but he was denied medical attention before he died.

== Outcomes ==
Overall, the action did not achieve its objectives of improving conditions within the prison or gaining access to legal counsel. However, one of the prisoners on strike, Babak Bordbar, was released for unknown reasons on August 10.

=== Other responses ===
Since the Islamic Iranian Revolution of 1979, several lawyers, journalists and activists have been imprisoned for ambiguously defined charges such as "spreading propaganda against the regime", or "insulting the Supreme Leader". Moreover, many fundamental rights of those imprisoned are violated, such as access to legal counsel or freedom from arbitrary imprisonment.

Human rights violations within Iranian prisons have stimulated many criticisms and controversies among the international community.

In 2004, the United Nations Working Group on Arbitrary Detention likened Iran's use of solitary confinement to the Convention Against Torture's definition of inhumane treatment.

In 2014, the Canadian parliament qualified the prison conditions and the systematic use of torture for extracting confessions as a "crime against humanity."

The UN identifies several other practices of the Iranian government that infringe on elements of human rights law, such as right to life, right to freedom and association, and freedom from cruel punishment.

== See also ==
- 1979 Iranian Revolution
- List of modern conflicts in the Middle East
- Iranian Green Movement
- 2009 Iranian presidential election protests
- The Green Path of Hope
- The Green Scroll Campaign
- Where is my vote?
