= Incarcerated Workers Organizing Committee =

Labor union for prisoners

IWOC
- Incarcerated Workers Organizing Committee
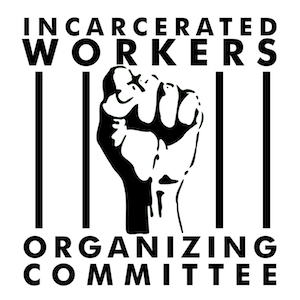
- Founded: July 31, 2014; 12 years ago
- Location: International
- Publication: Incarcerated Worker
- Website: incarceratedworkers.org

The Incarcerated Workers Organizing Committee (IWOC) is a prison-led section of the Industrial Workers of the World. Its purpose is 'a union for the incarcerated,' with the goal of abolishing prison slavery, as well as fighting to end the exploitation of working-class people around the world.

== History ==
The Incarcerated Workers Organizing Committee was founded as a labor union for prisoners. Among those who helped to found the IWOC was Brianna Peril. Peril is an expelled member of the Industrial Workers of the World (IWW), a labor union founded in 1905. She was previously imprisoned in the 1980s. The IWOC is a committee of the IWW dating back to 2014, intended to “build class solidarity” between members of the working class and incarcerated members, “strategically and tactically support prisoners,” amplify their voices, and struggle to “end the criminalization, exploitation, and enslavement” of working class people.

On September 9, 2016, the IWOC participated marginally in a U.S. prison strike on the 45th anniversary of the Attica uprising. The strike involved an estimated 24,000 prisoners in 24 states, the largest prison strike in U.S. history. The IWOC claimed credit for the strike alongside the Free Alabama Movement.

This was followed through with another prison strike on August 21, 2018 which was organized by Jailhouse Lawyers Speak and supported by the Committee. The strikers protested against a system they describe as "prison slavery", making 10 demands. Two notable demands, for example, were that the Prison Litigation Reform Act be rescinded, and that inmates serving their sentences get their voting rights back, alongside pre-trial detainees and ex-convicts. This strike lasted until September 9, the same day the first prison strike started, and was supported by the ACLU. Prisoner participation occurred in at least 17 states.

Despite the strike ending on September 9, 2018, some prisoners continued to strike.

In 2019, the Committee successfully lobbied for the local government of Gainesville, Florida to stop using prison labor in collaboration with Florida's Department of Corrections. The same year, the IWOC was among the groups that lobbied for the Florida Democrats to return a donation from G4S, a private prison contractor. In Wisconsin, the group lobbied to end solitary confinement.

During the COVID-19 pandemic, the Committee has advocated on behalf of prisoners who had been affected in some way, such as those who had been infected or were affected by prison lockdowns. This has included advocating for those who had a health condition or a minor sentence to receive an early conditional release from incarceration during the pandemic, due to risk of infection.

== Mission and goals ==
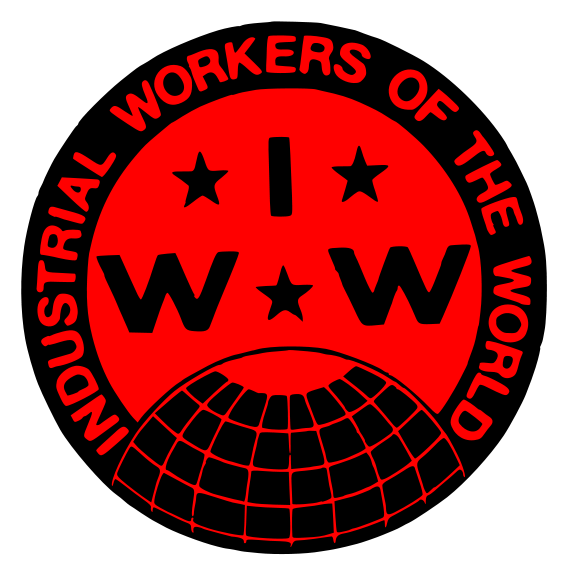
Current logo of the IWW, IWOC's parent organization

On July 31, 2014, IWOC released their official Statement of Purpose, which includes five key tenets:

1. To further the revolutionary goals of incarcerated people and the IWW through mutual organizing of a worldwide union for emancipation from the prison system.
2. To build class solidarity amongst members of the working class by connecting the struggle of people in prison, jails, and immigrant and juvenile detention centers to workers struggles locally and worldwide.
3. To strategically and tactically support prisoners locally and worldwide, incorporating an analysis of white supremacy, patriarchy, prison culture, and capitalism.
4. To actively struggle to end the criminalization, exploitation, and enslavement of working-class people, which disproportionately targets people of color, immigrants, people with low income, LGBTQ people, young people, dissidents, and those with mental illness.
5. To amplify the voices of working-class people in prison, especially those engaging in collective action or who put their own lives at risk to improve the conditions of all.

== See also ==
- Prison abolition movement
- Penal labor in the United States
- Free Alabama Movement
