= 2013 California prisoner hunger strike =

- Part of Incarceration in the United States
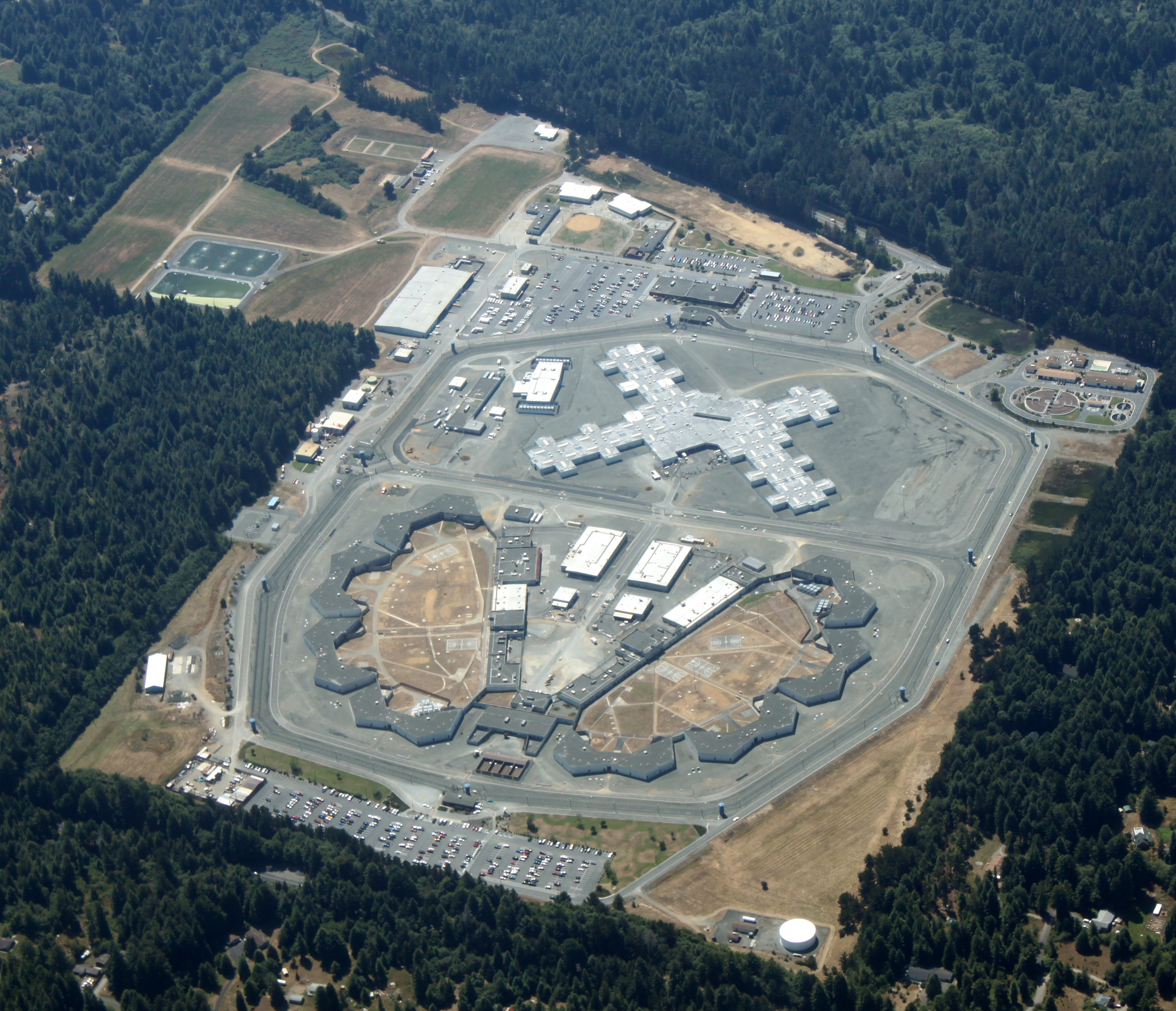
- Aerial view of Pelican Bay
- Date: July 8–September 5, 2013
- Location: Pelican Bay State Prison
- Caused by: Solitary confinement, poor sanitation, poor food quality, limited library access
- Methods: Hunger strike

Parties
Inmates of Pelican Bay State Prison	Government of California

The 2013 California prisoner hunger strike started on July 8, 2013, involving over 29,000 inmates in protest of the state's use of solitary confinement practices and ended on September 5, 2013. The hunger strike was organized by inmates in long term solitary in the Security Housing Unit (SHU) at Pelican Bay State Prison in protest of inmates housed there that were in solitary confinement indefinitely for having supposed gang ties. Another hunger strike that added to the movement started the week before in High Desert State Prison. The focus of the High Desert State Prison hunger strike was to demand cleaner facilities, better food and better access to the library.

Due to the two-month hunger strike, lawmakers agreed to hold public hearings on the conditions within California's maximum security prisons where this prolonged solitary confinement has taken place. Following this announcement, a week later on September 4, 2013, there were 100 inmates in two prisons on a hunger strike; 40 of them had been on a hunger strike continuously since July 8. All remaining hunger strikers, in light of the lawmaker's promise, resumed eating on September 5, 2013.

On July 22, 2013, an inmate, Billy "Guero" Sell, died after requesting medical attention for seven days leading up to his death.

== Human rights concerns and solitary confinement ==
Health and human rights concerns surrounding California's use of solitary confinement are not a new phenomenon. Questions regarding both the mental and physical health of prisoners kept in solitary confinement have been prevalent since the practice began in the early 1800s. Solitary confinement in United States' prisons is the practice of detaining prisoners in a single cell for between 22 and 24 hours a day. The majority of prisoners confined in solitary confinement in California are contained to 11-foot-by-7-foot windowless concrete cells. These cells generally contain a toilet, shower, a slot in the door large enough for a food tray, and a bed. California opened Corona and Pelican Bay State prisons in the late 1980s, which were two of the first and largest supermax prisons to be erected. In the case of Madrid v. Gomez in 1995, the U.S. district court for Northern California determined that a significant number of inmates held in SHU units within Pelican Bay prison suffered from mental health issues. California law allows for any prisoner to be placed into an SHU unit for an indefinite amount of time, so long as they are suspected to be active within a gang. The prisoners' release from the SHU unit can only be reviewed every six years. In Madrid the court determined that the Pelican Bay prison was failing to provide adequate mental and physical care for prisoners, and that the Pelican Bay SHU was in a state of a "mental health crisis". The Madrid case also brought to light the violence and cruel and unusual punishment that guards were inflicting upon inmates within the SHU unit of the prison, including acts such as caging inmates outside during inclement weather. The Supreme court in 2011 declared that the California prisons were overcrowded to the point of it being considered cruel and unusual punishment, effectively violating the 8th amendment. The supporting opinion on this bipartisan and landmark decision described that the California prison system had failed to meet the minimum requirements needed for the mental and physical health of prisoners. One year after the supreme court decision in 2011, California still had more than 10,000 inmates confined to solitary confinement, with 1,557 inmates having been kept in solitary confinement for at least 10 years. No state besides California is believed to have held such high numbers of prisoners in solitary confinement for such a prolonged period of time. Human Rights Watch, an independent organization that focuses on human rights, found that prolonged use of solitary confinement is inconsistent with respecting the inmates humanity. Amnesty International, a global human rights NGO, voiced support for the hunger striker's concerns as well as saying that California has fallen short of international law and the necessary standards for humane treatment due to California's use of solitary confinement.

== Organization of the strike ==
The Hunger strike began in early July 2013 by inmates across prisons in California in an effort to protest solitary confinement and inhumane conditions within the prisons. The strike began and was led by inmates within the Pelican Bay Prison's SHU unit. The leaders of the strike formed the Pelican Bay State Prison SHU Short Corridor Collective in 2011 to protest prolonged solitary confinement and debriefing practices that were common within the prison. At its peak 6,600 prisoners across 13 California jails participated in the 2011 hunger strike. The 2011 hunger strike was ended by the organizers after approximately a month because of the agreement by the California Department of Corrections and Rehabilitation to make reforms. The 2013 strike began because the Corridor Collective felt as if the CDCR had not kept their promises to them, and the Corridor Collective also announced that they had successfully gotten all racial groups to agree to band together to fight for better prison conditions. The creators of the Corridor Collective and also the leaders behind the strike were Todd Ashker, Arturo Castellanos, Ronnie Dewberry, and Antonio Guillen. Each of the leaders were prisoners within the Pelican Bay Prison SHU, with Ashker being a member of the Aryan Brotherhood, Castellanos belonging to the LA street gang Florencia 13, Dewberry being in the Black Guerrilla Family, and Guillen in the Nuestra Familia gang. The four men who collaborated to begin the strike had been placed within the short corridor section of the SHU due to the guard's belief that they were influential within the prison gangs, and the want to isolate them. Effectively, placing these men within the same pod made it possible for them to communicate with each other by yelling between their cells in order to coordinate the massive hunger strike. The men used their family and neighborhood networks to spread the message both inside and outside of the prison system of the upcoming strike, also sending letters to multiple prison solidarity groups in order to get the word out. Prisoners within the SHU unit also used methods such as speaking through the toilet drains, writing ghost messages in library books, or sending coded messages through family members in order to communicate with each other. The strikers made multiple demands of the prisons, including asking for an end to long-term solitary confinement along with group punishments, better and more nutritious food, along with ending policies surrounding the identification and treatment of suspected gang members. One of these specific practices is referred to as the "debriefing" policy, where California places suspected gang members into solitary confinement, and only agrees to place them back into general population if they provide the identities of other gang members. Along with the hunger strike, many inmates also began refusing to attend work and classes.

== Health concerns ==
After a few days of refusing food, the body stops feeling hungry and begins to break down proteins within muscle to create glucose according to the California Correctional Health Care Services. After two weeks of refusing food, people on hunger strike will begin to lose coordination and have difficulty standing and begin feeling overwhelmingly cold and sluggish. Once an individual has not eaten for 45 days or beyond, the risk of death due to cardiac arrest is very high. Prisoners' attorneys and doctors expressed concern over the strikers' potential health risks. Prison officials, however, implemented inhumane tactics in an attempt to force prisoners to end their strike. Prisoners were denied access to their medications, and were denied medical oversight. Some of the prisoners were only refusing solid foods, and they were denied access to any liquid substance other than water. These cruel methods of punishment received an abundance of backlash from the medical community, and the California Department of Corrections and Rehabilitation (CDCR) was heavily criticized. As a result, the plaintiffs in a class-action lawsuit about medical care in state prisons, the federal receiver in charge of prison health care and the CDCR jointly submitted a request to the United States District Court for the Northern District of California on August 19, 2013, for an order authorizing the refeeding under specified conditions of inmate-patients who were participating in the hunger strike. Judge Thelton E. Henderson granted the order the same day. The process of force-feeding, often referred to as "refeeding" within the prison system, can be as severe as inserting feeding tubes into prisoner's noses or stomach. Previously to this order, prisoners who had signed orders not to be resuscitated were not allowed to be force-fed based on California policy. Officials cited concerns over prisoners being coerced into participating in the hunger strike by gangs as a reason to force-feed them, which Judge Henderson agreed to ignore the signed "do-not resuscitate" orders of the prisoners due to these concerns. Despite the concerns by the CDCR that inmates were being coerced into participating, only one instance of explicit coercion was ever recorded by prison officials. By the time the order was put into effect, there were less than 200 prisoners still fasting, and numerous others had been hospitalized.

== Legal actions ==
The lawsuit, Todd Ashker, et al., vs. Governor of the State of California, et al., was brought by 10 Pelican Bay State Prison inmates who were housed in the Security Housing Unit (SHU). The lawsuit alleged that long-term confinement in the SHU violated the Eighth Amendment's prohibition of cruel and unusual punishment as well as the Fourteenth Amendment's clause for due process. The court case on September 1, 2015, was settled resulting in the termination of indeterminate solitary confinement in California and greatly reducing the number of individuals in solitary confinement as a whole. The court ruled in January 2019 that California continues to make constitutional violations, and that there will be an additional year of monitoring. Many prisoners feel that there is still much change needed as the debriefing process for gang affiliated prisoners was not revised.

== See also ==
- Prisoner rights in the United States
- Fact Sheet: Hunger Strikes in California Prisons
- Solitary Confinement
- Human Rights
