= Clarence Harrison =

American man wrongfully convicted of kidnapping and rape

Clarence Harrison (born 1959) was wrongfully convicted in 1987 for the kidnapping, rape and robbery of a 25-year-old-woman in Decatur, Georgia. He is the first person exonerated through the work of the Georgia Innocence Project.

He was married to his 1st wife and He fathered 2 daughters and had 1 step daughter before his incarceration. He has a total of 8 grand kids and 4 great grand children.

In the pre-dawn hours of October 25, 1986, a woman was attacked as she walked in the rain to a bus stop in Decatur, Georgia. The assailant hit her, dragged her to an embankment and raped her three times before she was able to get away and notify the police. During the incident, the assailant also stole her watch. Harrison became a suspect because he lived near the site of the abduction and a tip that someone at his house was trying to sell a watch, although the victim's watch was never found. Both the rape victim and the person providing the tip picked Harrison from a photo lineup. It was largely on this identification that Harrison was convicted on March 18, 1987, and sentenced to life in prison.

In February 2003, Harrison sent a hand-written letter to the newly opened Georgia Innocence Project. "Dear sirs, my name is Clarence Harrison. I am presently being held falsely accused of crimes I could not have committed," he wrote. "I am seeking to vindicate myself by the only means I know how." Interns from Georgia State University College of Law and Emory University School of Law saw the letter as worthy of further investigation. After finding slides from the rape kit previously thought to have been destroyed, modern DNA testing proved that Harrison was not the rapist.

On August 31, 2004, DeKalb Superior Court Judge Cynthia J. Becker granted the DeKalb County District Attorney's motion for a new trial and request that Harrison be released immediately. All charges were dismissed.

Three weeks after his release, Harrison married a woman who befriended him while he was in prison. Since his release, Harrison has worked to keep a positive attitude and help deter young people from crime.

The Georgia General Assembly compensated Harrison with a one million dollar sum payable as an annuity over twenty years. In March 2015 Harrison was bankrupt. He sold $735,000 in future annuity payments to Seneca One for just $272,000, not knowing he had to pay income taxes.

== See also ==
- List of wrongful convictions in the United States
- Prosecutorial misconduct
- Exculpatory evidence
- Innocence Project
- List of miscarriage of justice cases
- Innocent prisoner's dilemma
- Miscarriage of justice
- False confession
- Overturned convictions in the United States
- Capital punishment debate in the United States
- List of exonerated death row inmates
