= Prague High School =

Prague High School may refer to:

- Prague High School (Nebraska) in Prague, Nebraska
- Prague High School (Oklahoma) in Prague, Oklahoma
