= Bonnie Rich =

American politician

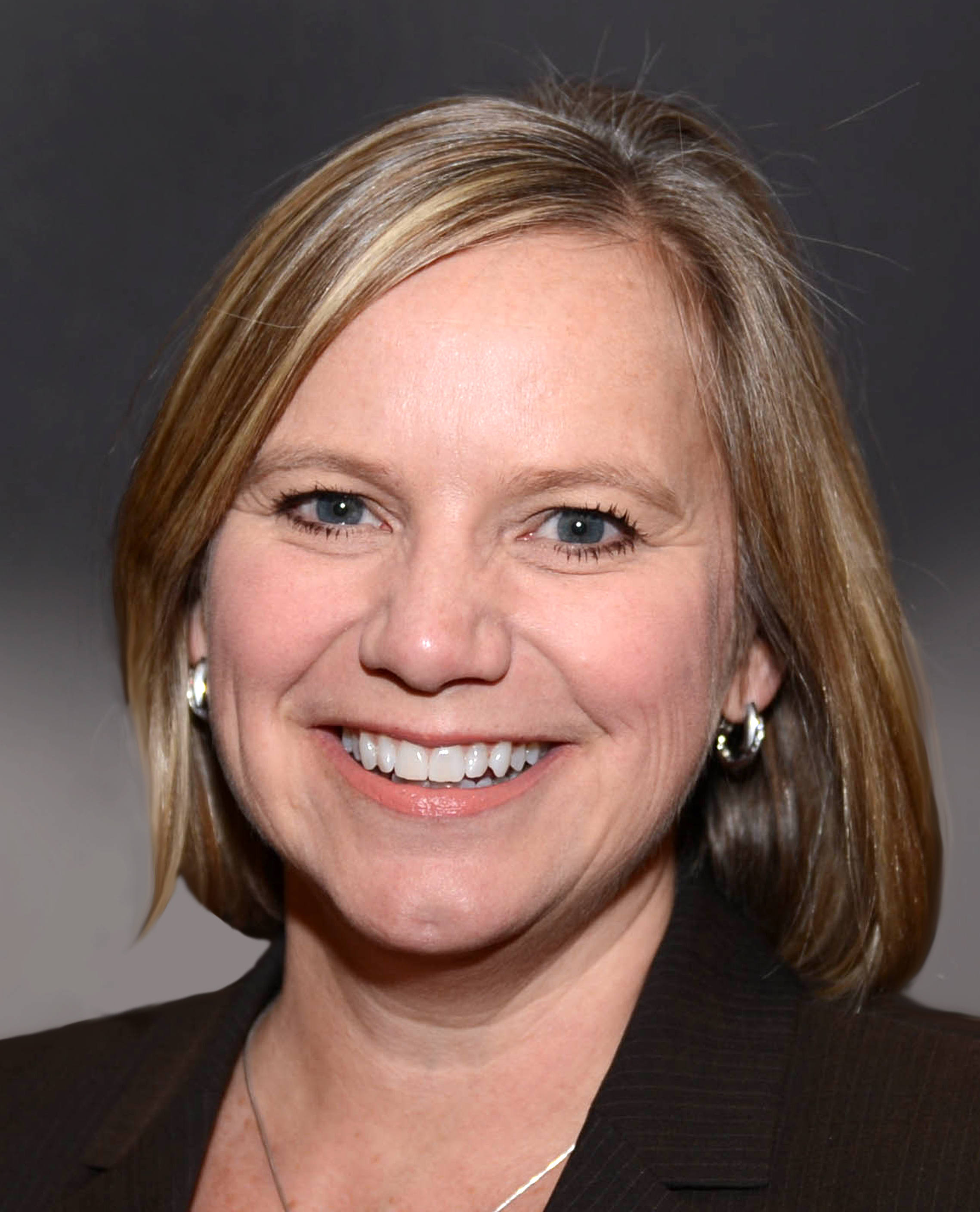

Member of the Georgia House of Representatives from the 97th district
- In office January 14, 2019 – January 9, 2023
- Preceded by: Brooks Coleman
- Succeeded by: David Clark (Redistricting)

Personal details
- Born: September 5, 1969 (age 57) Tyrone, Georgia
- Party: Republican
- Spouse: Randy Rich
- Children: 2
- Education: University of Georgia, Georgia State University College of Law
- Occupation: Attorney, politician

Bonnie Marie Rich is an American politician who served in the Georgia House of Representatives from the 97th District until she was defeated by fellow Republican David Clark in a primary on June 6, 2022. After redistricting placed them in the same district together, David Clark won with 59.25% of the vote against Rich. Rich served as a Republican member of the Georgia House of Representatives from 2019 to 2022.

== Early life and education ==
Rich was born in Tyrone, Georgia. Rich's mother is the late Donna Miller Young, and her father is the late Kenneth Randall Miller. In 1991, Rich earned a Bachelor of Arts degree in Political Science from University of Georgia. Rich earned a J.D. degree in Law from Georgia State University College of Law. In August 2019, Rich completed the Legislative Leadership Training conducted by the Carl Vinson Institute of Government at the University of Georgia.

== Career ==
In 1994, Rich started her career as an Associate Attorney. In 1999, Rich became an Assistant General Counsel for Primerica Financial Services, until 2003. In 2008, Rich became the Assistant Director and Supervising Attorney of the Philip C. Cook Low Income Taxpayer Clinic at Georgia State University College of Law.

In 2014, Rich became an Attorney at Law at Bonnie Rich Law in Georgia.

=== Political career ===
On November 6, 2018, Rich won the election and became a Republican member of Georgia House of Representatives for District 97. Rich defeated Aisha Yaqoob with 55.86% of the votes. On November 3, 2020, as an incumbent, Rich won the election and continued serving District 97. Rich defeated Mary Blackmon Campbell with 52.17% of the votes.

In 2021, while chair of the Georgia House redistricting committee, Rich helped secure passage of a new redistricting map criticized for being gerrymandered in favor of Republicans. This same map that she oversaw development of placed her in the same district with conservative State Representative David Clark, who defeated her in the 2022 Republican Primary.

== Personal life ==
Rich's husband is Randy Rich, a judge. They have two children. Rich and her family now live in Gainesville, Forsyth County, Georgia.

Georgia House of Representatives
Preceded by Brooks Coleman	Member of the Georgia House of Representatives from the 97th district 2019–2023	Succeeded by Ruwa Romman
