= Georgia's 97th House of Representatives district =

State district in Georgia, USA

Georgia's 97th State House of Representatives district
Representative
Ruwa Romman; D–Duluth
- Demographics: 53.2% White; 13.1% Black; 8.6% Hispanic; 22.4% Asian
- Population: 59,037

District 97 elects one member of the Georgia House of Representatives. It contains parts of Gwinnett County.

== Members ==
- Brooks Coleman (until 2018)
- Bonnie Rich (2019–2023)
- Ruwa Romman (since 2023)
