= Cynthia J. Becker =

American judge (born 1957)

Judge for the DeKalb County Superior Court, Stone Mountain Judicial Circuit
- In office August 2000 – March 1, 2015

Personal details
- Born: Cynthia Jeanne Becker; February 26, 1957 (age 69) Patrick Air Force Base, Florida, U.S.
- Education: University of Central Florida (BA); Georgia State University College of Law (JD)

Cynthia Becker Mello (born February 26, 1957) is a former Georgia Superior Court Judge on the DeKalb Superior Court, Stone Mountain Judicial Circuit, from 2000 until March 1, 2015. She presided over several high-profile cases, including the criminal trial of former Sheriff Sidney Dorsey and the release of exonerated Clarence Harrison.

== Career ==
- DeKalb County Drug Court, Tracks 1 & 2 - Presiding Judge
- Judge of DeKalb County Superior Court (August 2000 – March 2015)
- Trial lawyer and partner for Chambers, Mabry (1988 – 2000)

== Education ==
- University of Central Florida, Bachelor's degree in Finance
- 1987- Juris Doctor from Georgia State University College of Law

== Controversy ==
Becker announced her resignation from the DeKalb County Superior Court in November, 2014, citing her engagement to be married, under the cloud of a Georgia Judicial Qualification Commission investigation into her handling of a case where she rejected a witness' testimony in a public corruption case.

In August, 2015, a Cobb County, Georgia grand jury indicted Becker on charges that she lied to the state judicial watchdog agency about her handling of that case. The charges were dismissed a few days later and the prosecutor was scolded for seeking the indictment.

== Acclamations ==
- Master, Bleckley Inn of Court, Georgia State University College of Law
- Board of Visitors, GSU College of Law
- 2006 Member of Judicial Workload Assessment Committee and was appointed by Chief Justice Sears
- Council of Superior Court Judges of Georgia - Treatment and Accountability Courts Committee and has also chaired on Public Outreach; Court Security for the 4th Judicial Administrative District, Pattern Jury Instruction Committee, Uniform Rules Committee, the Executive Planning Team, and Special Committee on Other Courts
- 2007 Transition into Law Practice Program Mentor
- Judicial Outreach - “Challenges of Being a Single Parent”; Mock Trials for elementary and middle school students
- Frequent Presenter at professional seminars for Judges, Lawyers, and other legal professionals focusing on: legal ethics, professionalism and implementation and expansion of Accountability and Treatment Courts
- 2006 Named Law Dragon as one of the leading Judges in the Country
- 2005 Decatur Rotary Past President, former Vice President of DeKalb Library Foundation, Class of Leadership DeKalb; member of the Southern Center for International Studies
- Professional Affiliations include: DeKalb Bar Association, DeKalb Lawyers’ Association, Atlanta Bar Association - Judicial Section, President Elect, the Georgia Bar Association, the American Bar Association - Judicial Branch, and the National Association of Women Judges
