= Stan Case =

American journalist (1952–2011)

- Case (circa 2003)
- Born: Stanley Wright Case; November 1952; Prague, Oklahoma, U.S.
- Died: November 22, 2011 (aged 59); Birmingham, Alabama, U.S.
- Education: Central State University (Oklahoma); Georgia State University College of Law
- Occupation: Broadcast journalist
- Years active: 1979–2011
- Notable credit(s): CNN Radio; Headline News
- Spouse: Angela Bettina Stiepel Case

Stanley Wright Case (November 1952 – November 22, 2011) was an American lawyer and broadcast journalist. He was best known as the news anchor of CNN Radio from 1985 to 2011.

== Early life and education ==
A native of Prague, Oklahoma, Case graduated from Prague High School in 1970. He received his bachelor's degree in Speech in 1975 from Central State University in Edmond, Oklahoma. In 1996, Case graduated cum laude with a Juris Doctor from the Georgia State University College of Law in Atlanta. He was licensed to practice law in the state of Georgia and also taught as a professor.

== Career ==
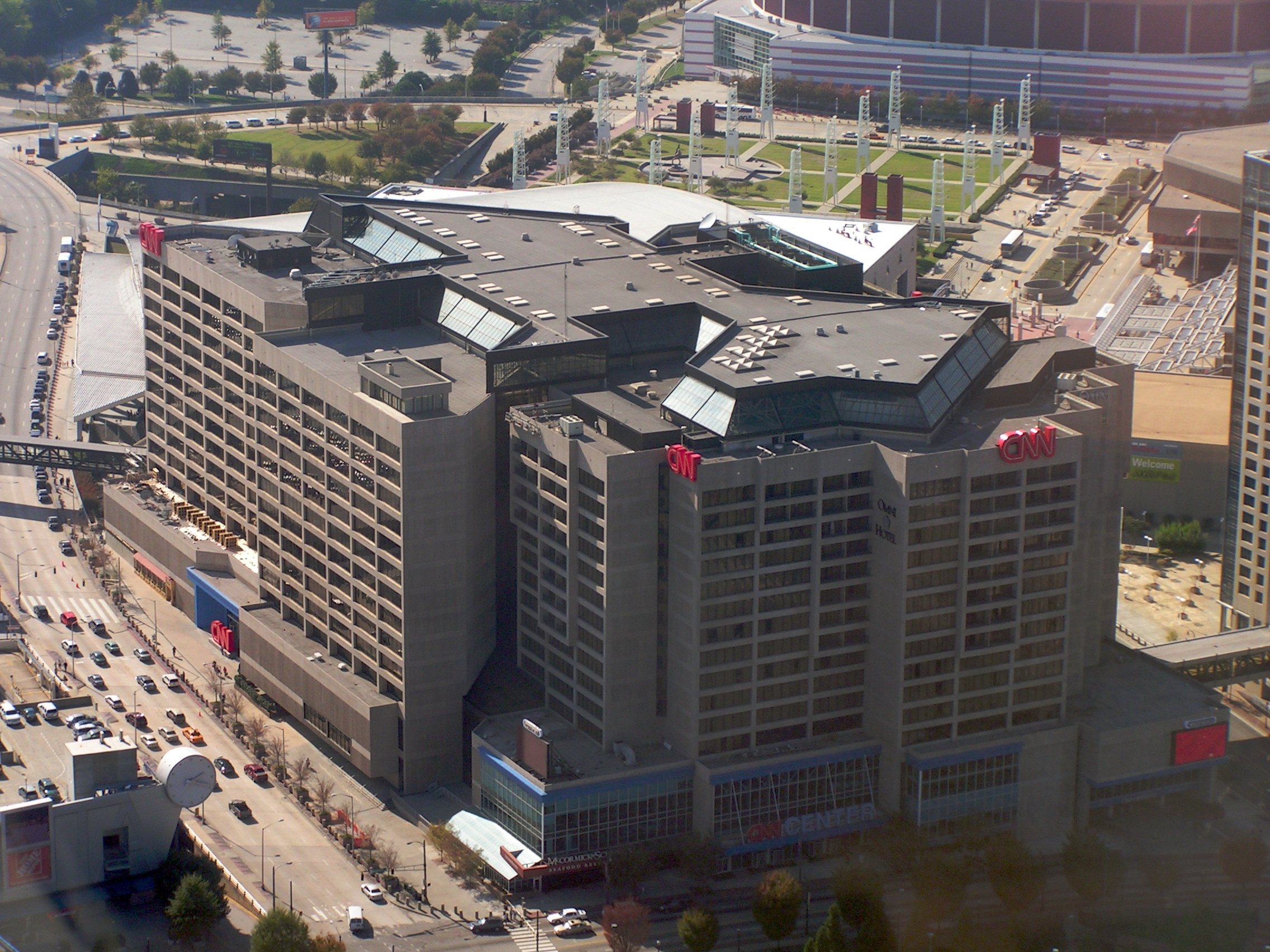
Case anchored CNN Radio in Atlanta, Georgia.

Case began his broadcast news career in the 1970s at small radio stations in Midwest City, Oklahoma and Jackson, Mississippi. He quickly moved on to KVOO (now KOTV) in Tulsa. By 1979, Case became a news correspondent for KEBC (now KOKQ) in Oklahoma City. He was a charter member and president of the Oklahoma City News Broadcaster's Association. Case spent two of his years at KEBC covering the state government of Oklahoma.

In 1985, Case joined CNN in Atlanta. He married Angela Bettina Stiepel, a writer at CNN. Jim Ribble of CNN said that the staff often consulted with Case about news coverage of court decisions because of his legal knowledge. Case and the staff of CNN Radio received the Ohio State Award for Excellence in 1991 for coverage of the Persian Gulf War. Mike Jones, a manager at CNN Radio, called Case "the backbone of this network". Case had also worked as a television anchor for CNN's sister network, Headline News.

== Death ==
Case was killed in an automobile accident on Bankhead Highway in Birmingham, Alabama, during a rainstorm on November 22, 2011. A pickup truck crossed into oncoming traffic at the intersection with Pratt Highway at about 3:05 p.m. and struck the Nissan Altima that Case was driving. Case died at the scene of the accident despite wearing his seatbelt. His wife Angela, who was riding with him, was injured in the crash, but survived and was taken to UAB Hospital for treatment. Case had recently celebrated his 59th birthday and was traveling to Oklahoma to visit his family for Thanksgiving.
