= Glynn County Police Department =

The Glynn County Police Department is the primary law enforcement agency in Glynn County, Georgia. Police Chief Jaques Battiste, the first Black chief in the county, began his tenure in 2021.

== History ==
In 2018 the department lost the accreditation of the Georgia Association of Chiefs of Police and the Commission on Accreditation for Law Enforcement Agencies due to multiple shortcomings. These included mismanagement of the evidence room and missing disciplinary records.

In early March 2020 Police Chief John Powell and three officers were indicted on charges that they ignored evidence that an officer was consorting with a drug dealer. Press reports indicated county narcotics officer James Cassada was having sex with confidential informants. Cassada went on to plead guilty and expose other wrongdoing at the department.

== Organization ==
The department has 122 sworn law enforcement officers and an unknown number of other employees.

The Patrol Division includes most of the police officers. Its units include:

- Uniformed Patrol Shifts
- Police K9 Unit
- Traffic Enforcement Unit
- H.E.A.T. (Highway Enforcement of Aggressive Traffic) Unit
- Community Relations Unit
- Airport Operations Unit

The Investigations Division includes:

- General Investigations Unit
- Special Investigations Unit
- Crime Scene, Evidence, and Victim Services Unit

There is a part-time SWAT whose personnel are assigned to other units.

== Notable cases ==
- Murder of Ahmaud Arbery
- Glynn County mass murder
