= Dalton Cooper =

American football player (born 2001)

No. 78 – Green Bay Packers
- Position: Offensive tackle
- Roster status: Practice squad

Personal information
- Born: March 15, 2001 (age 25); Prague, Oklahoma, U.S.
- Listed height: 6 ft 6 in (1.98 m)
- Listed weight: 326 lb (148 kg)

Career information
- High school: Prague (Prague, Oklahoma)
- College: Texas State (2019–2022); Oklahoma State (2023–2024)
- NFL draft: 2025: undrafted

Career history
- Kansas City Chiefs (2025)*; Green Bay Packers (2025–present)*
- * Offseason or practice squad member only

Awards and highlights
- Third-team All-Sun Belt (2021)
- Stats at Pro Football Reference

Dalton Cooper (born March 15, 2001) is an American professional football offensive tackle for the Green Bay Packers of the National Football League (NFL). He played college football for the Texas State Bobcats and Oklahoma State Cowboys.

== Early life ==
Cooper attended Prague High School in Prague, Oklahoma. He was rated as a three-star recruit and committed to play college football for the Texas State Bobcats over other schools such as Abilene Christian and New Mexico State.

== College career ==
=== Texas State ===
As a freshman in 2019, Cooper took a redshirt season. Ahead of the 2020 season, he became a starter on the Bobcats offensive line, and retained the starting spot through 2022. After the 2022 season, Cooper entered his name into the NCAA transfer portal.

=== Oklahoma State ===
Cooper transferred to play for the Oklahoma State Cowboys. Heading into the 2023 season, he was the Cowboys starting left tackle. In 2023, Cooper appeared in 14 games where he made 13 starts for Oklahoma State en route to earning honorable mention all-Big 12 Conference honors. In 2024, he appeared in nine games with eight starts before his season was cut short due to a knee injury. Cooper accepted an invite to play in the 2025 East-West Shrine Bowl.

== Professional career ==
Pre-draft measurables
Height	Weight	Arm length	Hand span	Wingspan	40-yard dash	10-yard split	20-yard split	20-yard shuttle	Three-cone drill	Vertical jump	Broad jump	Bench press
6 ft 5 1/2 in (1.97 m)	326 lb (148 kg)	33 1/2 in (0.85 m)	9 3/4 in (0.25 m)	6 ft 8 3/4 in (2.05 m)	4.99 s	1.78 s	2.92 s	4.64 s	7.90 s	28.0 in (0.71 m)	9 ft 0 in (2.74 m)	26 reps
All values from Pro Day

=== Kansas City Chiefs ===
Cooper signed with the Kansas City Chiefs as an undrafted free agent on May 3, 2025. He was waived on August 26 as part of final roster cuts.

=== Green Bay Packers ===
On August 28, 2025, Cooper signed with the Green Bay Packers' practice squad. He signed a reserve/future contract with Green Bay on January 12, 2026.

On August 30, 2026, Cooper was released by the Packers as a part of final roster cuts. A day later, he was re–signed to the Packers' practice squad.
