= Georgia State University College of Law =

Law school in Atlanta, Georgia

Coordinates: 33.7519°N 84.3855°W

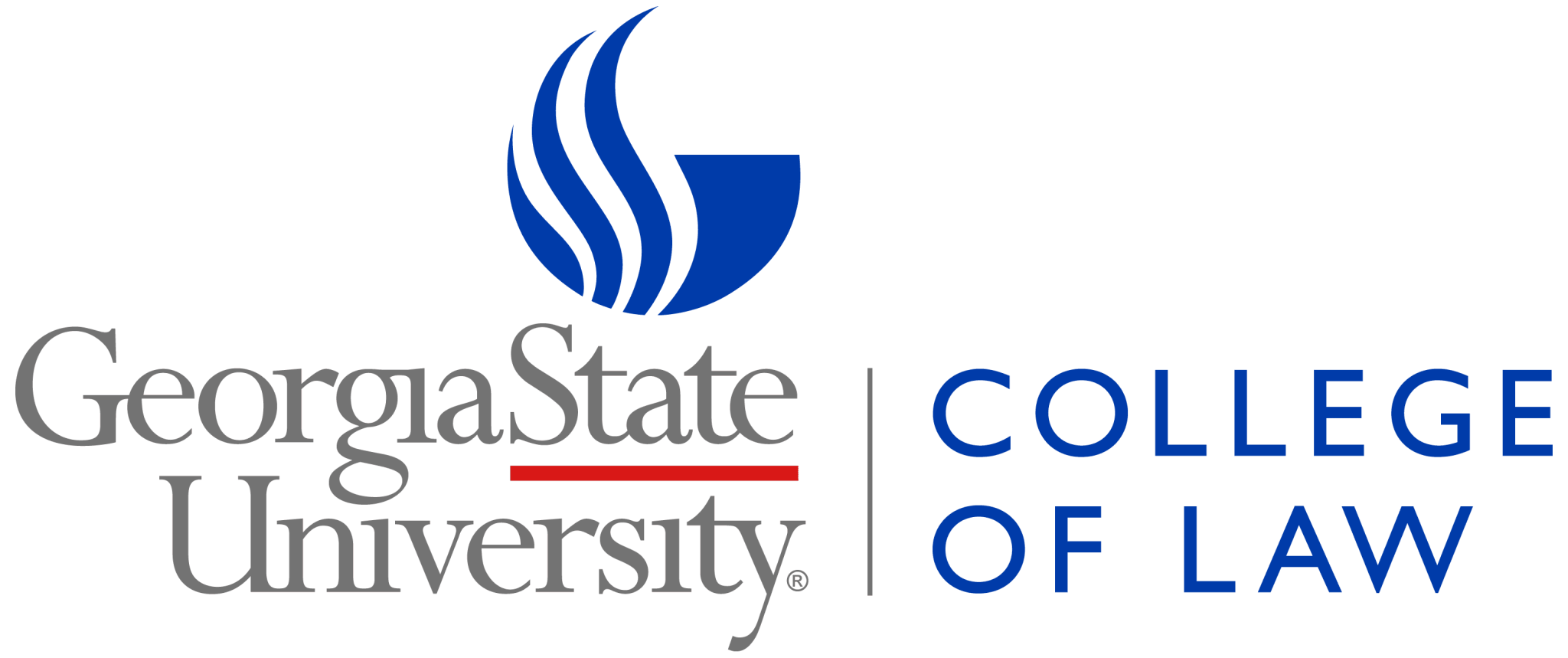
- Parent school: Georgia State University
- Established: 1982; 44 years ago
- School type: Public
- Dean: Courtney Anderson
- Location: Atlanta, Georgia, US
- Enrollment: 656 (Students)
- Faculty: 98 (Full- and part-time)
- USNWR ranking: 79th (2025)
- Bar pass rate: 73.9% (Georgia bar exam, February 2025 first-time takers)
- Website: law.gsu.edu
- ABA profile: Georgia State University College of Law

Georgia State University College of Law is a law school located in downtown Atlanta, Georgia. Founded in 1982, it is accredited by the American Bar Association and is a member of the Association of American Law Schools.

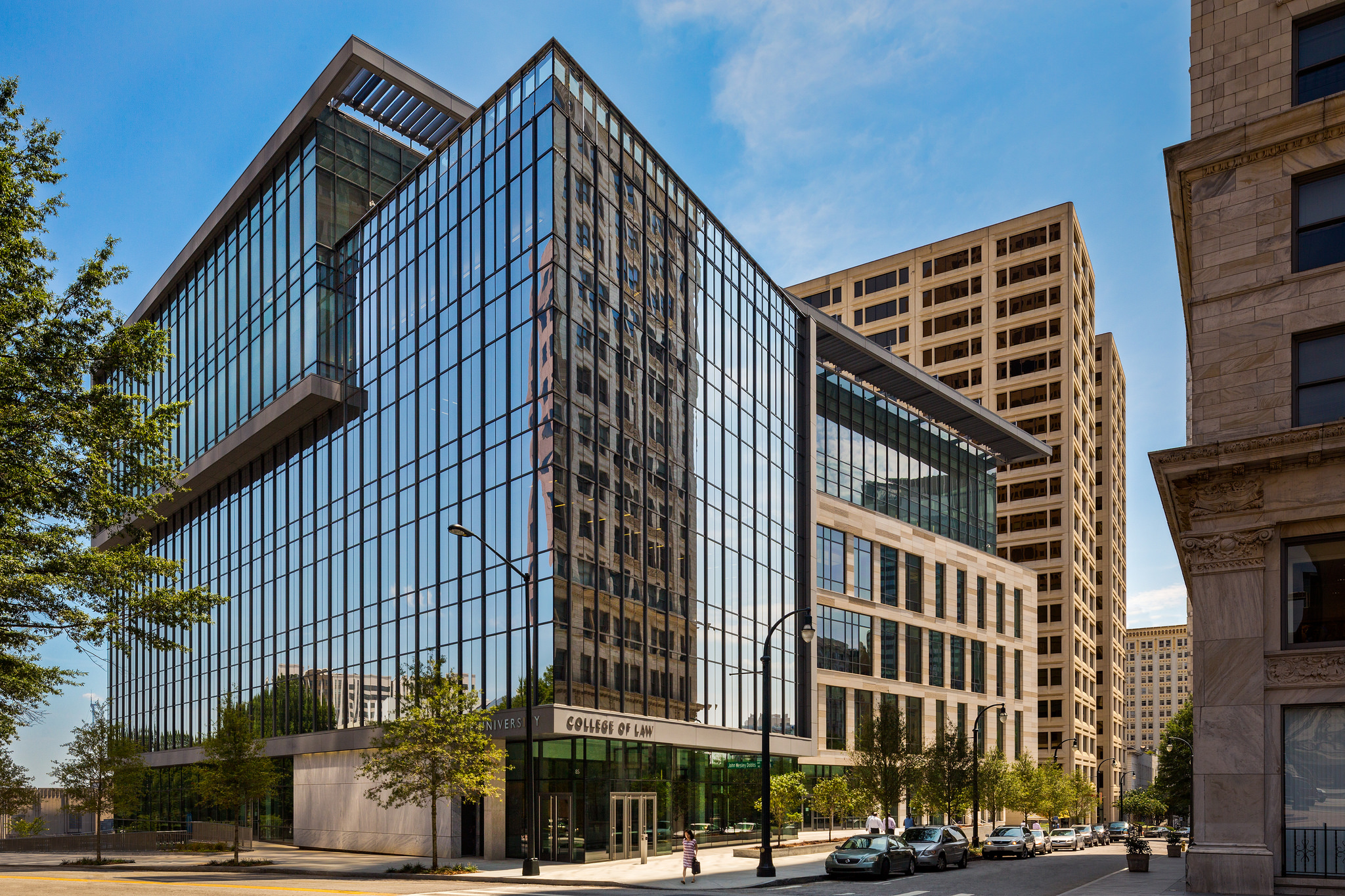
The Georgia State University College of Law building located at 85 Park Place in downtown Atlanta.

In addition to the Juris Doctor degree, the college offers joint degree programs with other colleges at Georgia State University and the Georgia Tech School of City and Regional Planning.

The college offers a full-time and a part-time program. The cost of tuition at Georgia State Law for the 2024–25 academic year is $17,596 for full time in-state students, $38,578 for out-of-state students and $38,850 for out-of-country students.

== History ==
As far back as the early 1970s, Georgia legislators and academic leaders debated establishing a new law school. The Georgia State University College of Law finally was sanctioned by the state's Board of Regents in 1981 and Ben F. Johnson became its first dean.

The college enrolled 200 students in its inaugural year, taught by six professors. Most students were part-time, and many took classes at night, because they had full-time jobs during the day. The college's first seven graduates were hooded in December 1984.

By the end of its first decade, full-time faculty had grown to 31, nearly half of whom were women.

== Rankings ==
In 2025, Georgia State University College of Law was ranked the 79th best law school by U.S. News & World Report. Its Health Care Law program was ranked 3rd out of 191 programs and its part-time program was ranked 21st out of 67 part-time programs. The law school was ranked 2nd out of the five law schools in the state of Georgia by the Fulton County Daily Report in 2024. Additionally, Georgia State University College of Law was named by Princeton Review in its 2024 edition as one of The Best 168 Law Schools.

== Tuition ==
The cost of tuition and fees at Georgia State University College of Law for the 2024–2025 academic year for full time in-state students is $17,596 and $38,578 for out-of-state students and $38,850 for out-of-country students.

== Admissions ==
For the Georgia State Law class entering in 2024, the school accepted 31.03% of applicants, with 34.02% of those accepted enrolling. Enrolled students had a median GPA of 3.56 and a median LSAT score of 159.

== Clinical programs ==
The school has a number of legal clinics, such as the Phillip C. Cook Low-Income Taxpayer Clinic, which serves low-income taxpayers.

== Study abroad ==
The school operates the Summer Academy in International Commercial Arbitration, a five-week, six-credit hour study abroad program based in Linz, Austria. the Buenos Aires Summer Program in Argentina (jointly sponsored with the Florida International University College of Law); and the Summer Legal and Policy Study in Rio de Janeiro, Brazil.

== Employment ==
According to Georgia State's official 2023 ABA-required disclosures, 93.3% of the Class of 2023 obtained some form of employment 10 months after graduation, with 83.33% obtaining Bar Passage Required employment (i.e. as attorneys). Most employment was with firms of one to ten attorneys although 25 graduates obtained employment with firms of over 500 attorneys. Most employment was in the State of Georgia. Georgia State's Law School Transparency under-employment score is 10%, indicating the percentage of the Class of 2023 unemployed, pursuing an additional degree, or working in a non-professional, short-term, or part-time job 10 months after graduation.

== Notable alumni ==
- Judiciary
  - Shawn LaGrua, J.D. 1987 - Associate Justice, Supreme Court of Georgia
  - John "Trea" Pipkin III, J.D. 2005 - Judge, Georgia Court of Appeals
  - J. Wade Padgett, J.D. 1990 - Judge, Georgia Court of Appeals
  - Jeff Davis, J.D. 1991 - Judge, Georgia Court of Appeals
  - Barbara Swinton, J.D. 1991 - Judge, Oklahoma Court of Civil Appeals
  - Cynthia J. Becker, J.D. 1987 - Judge, DeKalb County Superior Court
  - Bill Hamrick, J.D. 1991 - Superior Court Judge, Coweta Judicial Circuit; former member of the Georgia State Senate (D-30); incoming Georgia State-wide Business Court judge
  - Charles M. Eaton Jr, J.D. 2012 - Superior Court Judge, Atlanta Judicial Circuit; former member of the Georgia Public Service Commission
- Government
  - Glenn Richardson, J.D. 1984 - Former Speaker of the Georgia House of Representatives (2005-2010)
  - Cynthia Coffman, J.D. 1991 - 38th Attorney General of Colorado
  - Keisha Lance Bottoms, J.D. 1996 - Governor-elect of Georgia; former Director of the White House Office of Public Engagement and Senior Advisor to the President; former Mayor of Atlanta; former member of the Atlanta City Council
  - Steve Tumlin, J.D. 1988 - Mayor of Marietta, Georgia
  - Curt Thompson, J.D. 1993 - Former member of the Georgia State Senate (D-5); former member of the Georgia House of Representatives (69th District)
  - Rich Golick, J.D. 1997 - Former member of the Georgia House of Representatives (40th District)
  - Trey Kelley, J.D. 2014 - Current member of the Georgia House of Representatives (16th District)
  - Beth Moore, J.D. 2011 - Former member of the Georgia House of Representatives (95th District)
  - Sam Park, J.D. 2013 - Current member of the Georgia House of Representatives (101st District)
  - Matt Ramsey, J.D. 2005 - Former member of the Georgia House of Representatives (72nd District); House Majority Whip (2013-2016)
  - Bonnie Rich, J.D. 1994 - Former member of the Georgia House of Representatives (97th District)
  - Stephen Dickson, J.D. 1999 - 18th Administrator of the Federal Aviation Administration
  - Nika Rurua, J.D. 2001 - Former member of the Cabinet of Georgia (country)
- Other notable alumni
  - Claudia Brind-Woody, J.D. 1999 - IBM executive
  - Stan Case, J.D. 1996 - News anchor of CNN Radio (1985-2011)
  - Linda Dunikoski, J.D. 1993 - Prosecutor in the Atlanta Public Schools cheating scandal (2014-2015) and murder of Ahmaud Arbery (2021) trials
  - Emily Jacobson, J.D./MBA 2014 - Olympic saber fencer
- Notable faculty
  - Paul A. Lombardo, Professor of Law - Expert on the legacy of eugenics and sterilization in the United States, former senior advisor to the Presidential Commission for the Study of Bioethical Issues (2011–2016)
  - LaVonda Reed, seventh dean, then dean of the University of Baltimore School of Law (2024–present)
  - Thomas W. Thrash, Professor of Law (1986-1997), then judge of the United States District Court for the Northern District of Georgia, now senior status

== See also ==
- Georgia State University Law Review
