= Georgia Innocence Project =

American legal non-profit founded August 2002

- Formation: July 27, 2002
- Legal status: 501(c)(3) organization
- Purpose: Preventing and correcting wrongful convictions
- Headquarters: Atlanta, Georgia
- Chairman: Alan Essig
- Executive Director: Kristin Verrill
- Affiliations: Innocence Network
- Website: georgiainnocenceproject.org

The Georgia Innocence Project is a non-profit legal organization based in Atlanta, Georgia that works to correct and prevent wrongful convictions in the Deep South. The organization provides representation to Georgia prisoners whose innocence can be proven through modern DNA testing or other newly available evidence. It is a part of the Innocence Network and is the only organization in Georgia focused on investigating and litigating post-conviction claims of innocence.

As of January 2025, the organization has helped free or exonerate 15 people, with nine of these occurring since 2020. The organization has also played a central role in securing legislation to prevent and correct wrongful convictions, including Georgia's post-conviction DNA testing statute and legislation compensating exonerees.

== History ==
The Georgia Innocence Project was founded in 2002 by September Guy and Jill Polster, inspired by the exoneration of Calvin Johnson Jr. in 1999 by the Innocence Project in New York. Johnson was the first person in the state of Georgia to be exonerated through DNA, and his case highlighted to Guy and Polster the capacity of new scientific breakthroughs and forensic tools to expose wrongful convictions. Johnson subsequently served on the newly established Georgia Innocence Project's board of directors, and his sister continues to serve on the board as of 2025.

Aimee Maxwell was the organization's first executive director and was, for a time, its only staff member. The organization helped secure Georgia's adoption of a post-conviction DNA testing statute in 2003. In August 2004, Clarence Harrison became the first person to be exonerated by the organization's efforts after DNA testing conclusively proved his innocence. By the time of his exoneration, Harrison had spent over 17 years in prison. Robert Clark became the second person to be exonerated by the Georgia Innocence Project in December 2005, followed by Pete Williams in January 2007.

In 2016, Clare Gilbert took over as executive director and oversaw a substantial expansion of the organization. During Gilbert's tenure, the organization grew to a staff of more than ten, secured exonerations increasingly frequently, and significantly expanded its policy and legislative advocacy. Kristin Verrill succeeded Gilbert as executive director in 2025.

== Work ==
The Georgia Innocence Project's stated mission is to correct and prevent wrongful convictions in Georgia and to provide support and assistance to innocent people freed from wrongful conviction. The organization provides pro bono post-conviction legal representation to people currently incarcerated in Georgia whose innocence can be proven through modern DNA testing or other newly available evidence.

The organization has received over 7,000 requests for assistance and expends considerable resources identifying cases with the strongest innocence claims. In recent years, it has sought to use patterns of wrongful convictions to more efficiently identify innocence cases and exonerate wrongfully convicted individuals more efficiently, such as by using data aggregation to identify hotspots of police or prosecutorial misconduct.

In addition to direct legal representation, the organization also engages in policy and legislative advocacy to address the root causes of wrongful conviction, to make wrongful convictions easier to correct when they do occur, and to make it easier for freed and exonerated people to rebuild their lives after release from prison. The Georgia Innocence Project helped to pass Georgia's post-conviction DNA testing statute, and in recent years has focused on securing legislation providing compensation to innocent exonerees. In 2025, after a four-year long advocacy campaign by the Georgia Innocence Project, Georgia's Wrongful Conviction and Incarceration Compensation Act was signed into law with bipartisan support. The law provides exonerees who prove their innocence with $75,000 for each year they were incarcerated.

The organization has also helped strengthen eyewitness identification procedures, improve evidence retention, and increase the ethical obligations of police and prosecutors to act on exculpatory evidence.

As well as advocating for compensation for the wrongfully convicted, the Georgia Innocence Project also provides other re-entry support to its former clients and works to educate the public about wrongful convictions, including partnering with the Atlanta Hawks. In 2022, the Jimmy Carter Presidential Library and Museum housed an exhibition by the Georgia Innocence Project detailing the causes and consequences of wrongful convictions.

== Overturned convictions ==
As of January 2025, the Georgia Innocence Project has helped free and exonerate 15 people, with nine of these occurring since 2020.

- Clarence Harrison was, in 2004, the first person to be exonerated by the Georgia Innocence Project. Harrison served 17 years in prison before post-conviction DNA testing proved his innocence. Jeffrey Brickman, the District Attorney who dropped the charges against Harrison after his conviction was overturned, later joined the Georgia Innocence Project's board.
- Robert Clark was wrongfully convicted of rape, kidnapping, and armed robbery in 1982 as a result of faulty eyewitness identification. He consistently proclaimed his innocence until, in 2005, post-conviction DNA testing secured by the Innocence Project and Georgia Innocence Project proved his innocence, leading to his release and subsequent exoneration.
- Pete Williams was exonerated in 2007 after serving nearly 22 years of a 45-year prison sentence for a sexual assault that DNA testing eventually showed he did not commit.
- John White was exonerated in 2007 after serving more than 22 years for a sexual assault he did not commit after the victim mistakenly identified him in a lineup, saying she was "almost positive" it was him. Post-conviction DNA testing ultimately excluded White and revealed that another man, James Parham, who had been in the original lineup, was the actual perpetrator.
- Michael Marshall was exonerated by the efforts of the Georgia Innocence Project in 2008 after DNA testing excluded Marshall as the perpetrator and isolated the DNA of another man.
- Michael Googe was exonerated in 2015 as a result of a unique grant-funded collaboration between the Georgia Innocence Project, Prosecuting Attorneys' Council of Georgia, and the Georgia Bureau of Investigation, to search for potentially exculpatory DNA evidence in CODIS hits. The partnership discovered a CODIS hit that had been provided to police after Googe's conviction but ignored.
- Kerry Robinson was exonerated in 2020 after serving 20 years in prison. At trial, a Georgia Bureau of Investigation laboratory analyst incorrectly characterized the DNA evidence. Subsequent DNA testing revealed the flaws in the analyst's testimony and showed that a random African American man was 1,800 times "more likely" than Robinson to have contributed to the DNA mixture collected from the crime scene.
- Johnny Lee Gates served 43 years in prison for armed robbery, rape, and murder. Incentivized informants led police to Gates, a Black man with a sixth-grade education, who was convicted by an all-white jury and sentenced to death. The State destroyed the vast majority of evidence in Gates' case, but two Georgia Innocence Project interns found physical evidence in the district attorney's archived files, despite the State having previously stated that this evidence had been destroyed. After getting the evidence tested, Gates was finally released in 2020.
- Terry Talley was exonerated of four rape convictions in 2021 after a multi-year collaboration with the LaGrange Police Department to re-investigate Talley's case.
- Dennis Perry was exonerated in 2021 after being sentenced to life without parole for a double homicide. In 2024, another man, Erik Sparre, was charged for the murders.
- Ronald Jacobsen was exonerated in 2021 after serving 31 years in prison.
- Devonia Inman was convicted in 2001 of a murder in Adel, Georgia, after incentivized witnesses led police to Inman. The witnesses later recanted their stories, and DNA evidence indicated another man, Hercules Brown, was the perpetrator. The Georgia Attorney General continued to litigate the case, even after Georgia Supreme Court Justice David Nahmias encouraged the prosecutors "to do the right thing." Inman was finally exonerated in 2021, more than 20 years after his conviction.
- Lee Clark was exonerated in 2022 after serving 25 years in prison.
- Joey Watkins was exonerated in 2023 after serving 22 years in prison.
- Ray White's conviction was overturned in 2024 after faulty eyewitness identification led to his wrongful conviction.

== In popular culture ==
The Georgia Innocence Project has had many of its cases featured in the media, including the podcasts Undisclosed (podcast), AJC's Breakdown, and Actual Innocence. Exoneree and former Georgia Innocence Project board member Calvin Johnson Jr. co-authored Exit to Freedom with Greg Hampikian.

== See also ==
- List of wrongful convictions in the United States
- List of exonerated death row inmates
