= Linda Dunikoski =

American lawyer and prosecutor

- Education: Indiana University Bloomington; Georgia State University College of Law (JD)
- Occupations: Lawyer, prosecutor

Linda Jeanne Dunikoski is an American lawyer and prosecutor who serves as a senior assistant district attorney in Cobb County, Georgia. She was a prosecutor of the Atlanta Public Schools cheating scandal in 2014–2015 and the murder of Ahmaud Arbery in 2021.

== Life ==
Linda Jeanne Dunikoski earned a Bachelor's Degree in Political Science from Indiana University Bloomington in 1988. She completed a J.D. at Georgia State University College of Law in 1993.

In 2009, Dunikoski was an assistant district attorney in Fulton County, Georgia. In October 2009, Dunikoski was jailed and cited for contempt over a $100 fine by Judge Marvin S. Arrington Sr. The Supreme Court of Georgia issued a stay of the contempt order in November 2009. From August 11, 2014 to April 1, 2015, she was one of four prosecutors working the Atlanta Public Schools cheating scandal case. Dunikoski resigned as executive assistant district attorney with the Fulton County District Attorney's Office on August 23, 2019. She worked for Fulton County for 17 years, specializing in major crimes homicide and RICO prosecution.

Since September 2019, Dunikoski works as a senior assistant district attorney in Cobb County, Georgia. She heads the appeals section. In 2021, Dunikoski was a prosecutor for the murder of Ahmaud Arbery case. Her prosecution strategy leading to a conviction garnered the praise of legal observers. She faced criticism for not placing greater emphasis on racism in the Arbery case.
