= Chuck Eaton =

American politician (born 1969)

Charles M. Eaton Jr.
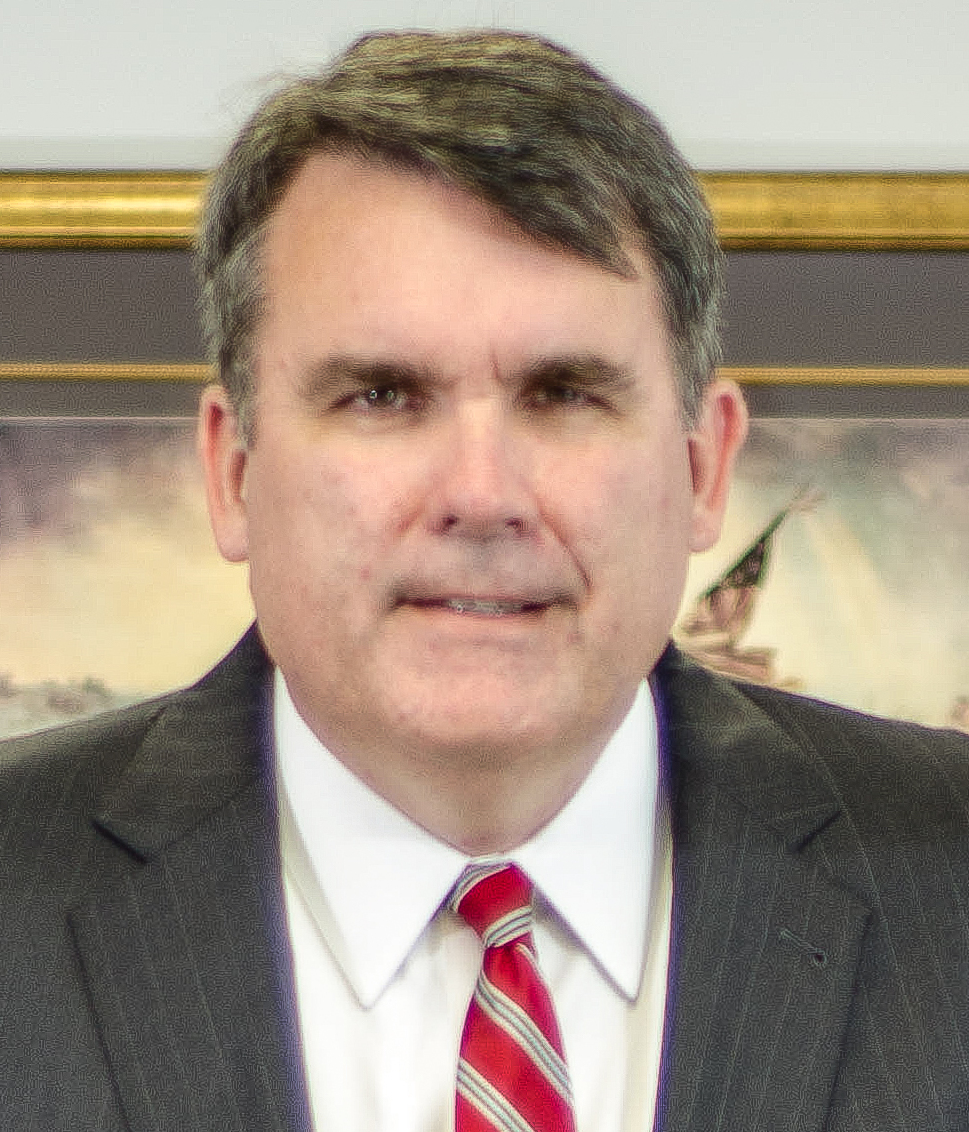

Judge of the Georgia Superior Courts in the Atlanta Judicial Circuit
- Incumbent
- Assumed office August 12, 2021
- Appointed by: Brian Kemp
- Preceded by: Shawn Ellen LaGrua

Member of the Georgia Public Service Commission for District 3
- In office January 2007 – August 12, 2021
- Preceded by: David Burgess
- Succeeded by: Fitz Johnson

Personal details
- Born: April 1, 1969 (age 57)
- Party: Republican
- Education: University of Alabama (BS); Georgia State University (JD)

Charles "Chuck" Eaton Jr. (born April 1, 1969) is a Judge on the Fulton County Superior Court in the Judicial Circuit of Atlanta, Georgia. He was appointed to the Court by Georgia Governor Brian Kemp on August 12, 2021.

Prior to his judicial appointment, Eaton served for 15 years on the Georgia Public Service Commission.

== Biography ==
Eaton received an Accounting Degree in 1991 from the University of Alabama and a Juris Doctor in 2012 from Georgia State University College of Law. From 2007 to 2021, he was a Georgia statewide elected official serving on the Public Service Commission. He served four terms as the Chairman of the commission.

In 2008, Judge Eaton was chosen by The Atlanta Business Chronicle as one of the "100 Most Influential Atlantans." Georgia Trend Magazine selected him as one of the "100 Most Influential Georgians" in 2016 and 2021.

== Elections ==
=== 2026 Fulton County Superior Court Campaign ===
Eaton ran unopposed in the May 19, 2026 election and secured an additional four-year term.

=== 2022 Fulton County Superior Court Campaign ===
Due to having been appointed to the Fulton Superior Court, Judge Eaton was required to run in the next election. Therefore, he was on the ballot for the May, 2022 election and won by a margin of over 14 points, with 57.21% of the vote. Chuck Eaton was elected to a four-year term.

=== 2018 Public Service Commission Campaign ===
In 2018, Eaton was re-elected to a third term on the Georgia Public Service Commission. As stated in the Atlanta Journal-Constitution, he won in a runoff election, with "52 percent of the vote to Lindy Miller's roughly 48 percent of the roughly 1.4 million votes cast". In 2017, Commissioner Eaton was part of a unanimous vote to continue the controversial, Plant Vogtle nuclear construction. The project was a central focus of the 2018 television debates. In an Atlanta Magazine interview, he restated his support of Vogtle because, "Vogtle is part of our state's long-range fuel mix strategy and as a 60-year asset will provide reliable, affordable, zero-carbon energy for Georgia consumers into the foreseeable future. Diversity in generation is essential in ensuring our electric rates continue to remain competitive." In the Wall Street Journal he stated, “I still believe that nuclear still needs to be part of a diversified mix."

=== 2012 Public Service Commission Campaign ===
According to the Atlanta Business Chronicle, "Republican Chuck Eaton captured 52.2 percent of the vote in a three-way race to win a second term on the Georgia Public Service Commission."

=== 2006 Public Service Commission Campaign ===
Chuck Eaton was first elected to the PSC on December 5, 2006. He was elected in a statewide runoff, defeating incumbent David Burgess, with 52% of the vote.

Political offices
Preceded by David Burgess	Member of the Georgia Public Service Commission from the 3rd district 2007–2021	Succeeded by Fitz Johnson
