= Brooks Coleman =

American politician

Member of the Georgia House of Representatives from the 80th district
- In office 1993 – January 3, 2003
- Succeeded by: Ben Harbin

Member of the Georgia House of Representatives from the 65th district
- In office January 3, 2003 – January 3, 2005
- Preceded by: Michele Henson
- Succeeded by: Sharon Beasley-Teague

Member of the Georgia House of Representatives from the 97th district
- In office 2005 – January 14, 2019
- Preceded by: Quincy Murphy
- Succeeded by: Bonnie Rich

Personal details
- Born: October 11, 1939 (age 86) Atlanta, Georgia, United States
- Party: Republican

Brooks P. Coleman, Jr. (born October 11, 1939) is an American politician. He was a member of the Georgia House of Representatives from 1992 to 2018. He is a member of the Republican party.
