= Ruwa Romman =

American politician (born 1993)

- رواء رمان
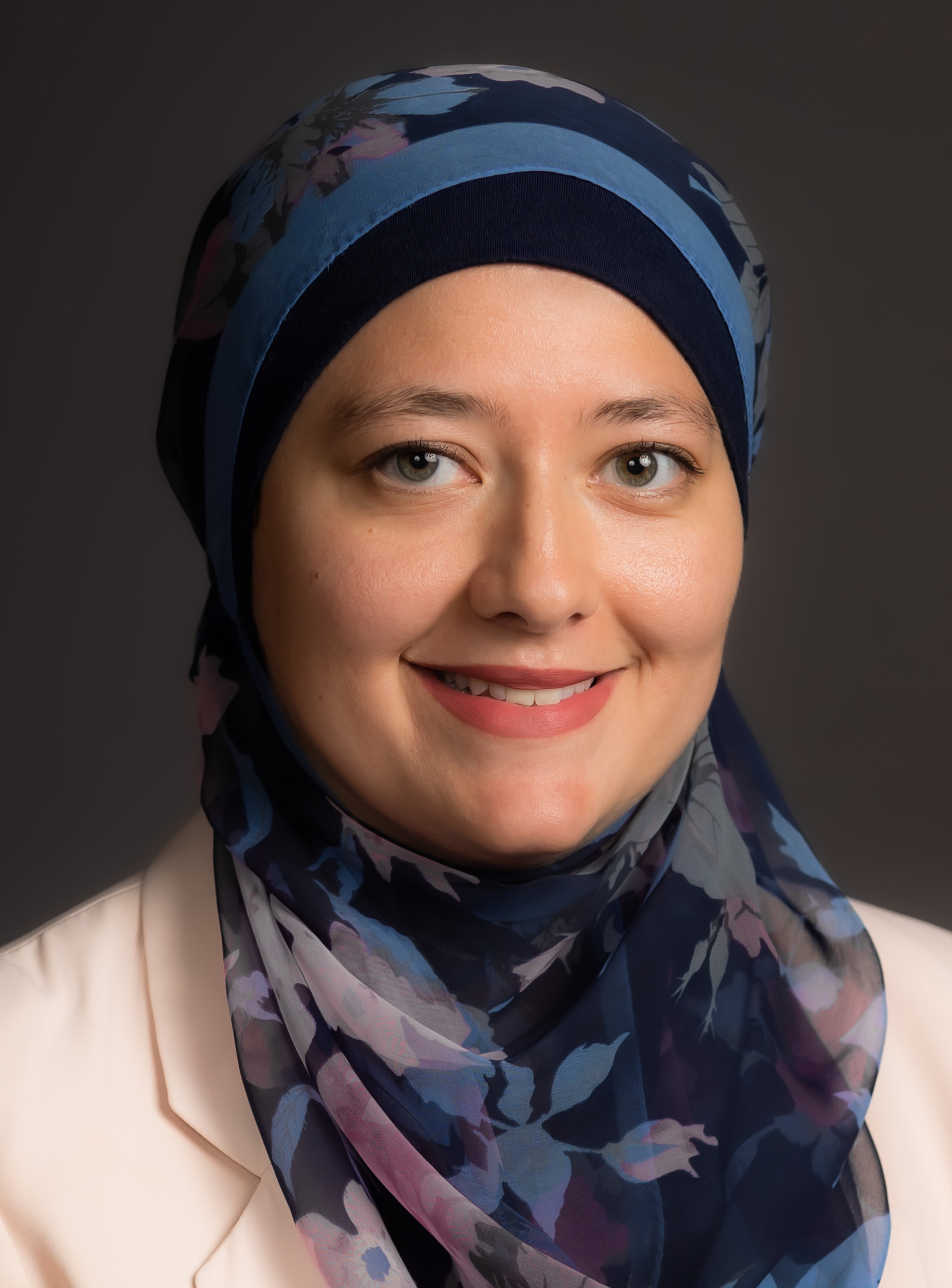
- Official portrait, 2024

Member of the Georgia House of Representatives from the 97th district
- Incumbent
- Assumed office January 9, 2023
- Preceded by: Beth Moore (redistricted)

Personal details
- Born: June 14, 1993 (age 33) Jordan
- Party: Democratic
- Other political affiliations: Working Families Party; Democratic Socialists of America (Note: The Democratic Socialists of America (DSA) are not a registered political party. Instead, they are a political organization for those with democratic socialist ideologies.)
- Spouse: Shahzaib Jiwani
- Education: Oglethorpe University (BA); Georgetown University (MPP)
- Website: State house website Campaign website

Ruwa Romman (Arabic: رواء رمان, born June 14, 1993) is an American politician serving as a member of the Georgia House of Representatives for the 97th district. A Democrat, she is the first Palestinian and Muslim woman elected to the body. She briefly ran for Governor of Georgia in the 2026 gubernatorial election on a progressive platform, but withdrew before the primary, shifting to a successful campaign for State Senate. Romman is a member of the Georgia Working Families Party and the Democratic Socialists of America, joining the latter organization in 2026.

== Early life and education ==
Romman was born in Jordan to a Palestinian family and moved to the United States when she was seven years old. Romman attended South Forsyth High School before going to Oglethorpe University and Georgetown University’s McCourt School of Public Policy. She graduated from McCourt with a Master of Public Policy in 2019.

== Career ==
After graduation, Romman worked for Deloitte as a senior consultant. She has been involved in local politics and civic engagement groups since 2014 and co-founded the Georgia Volunteer Hub in 2020, which trained thousands of volunteers to support the Georgia Senate runoff election.

In January 2022, Romman announced her candidacy for the Georgia House of Representative in District 97. On May 24, 2022, Romman won the Democratic primary against JT Wu. On November 8, 2022, Romman won the general election, making her the first Muslim woman to be elected into the Georgia State House of Representatives.

During her 2022 campaign, Romman was endorsed by NARAL, Fair Fight, the Georgia Working Families Party, and the Asian-American Advocacy Fund. Romman campaigned on expanding health care access, protecting voting rights, supporting access to abortion and helping working families.

On November 22, 2022, Romman was interviewed by journalist Peter Biello for Georgia Public Broadcasting. In December 2022, Romman was interviewed by Geoff Bennett for a PBS News Hour segment titled "How Muslim American candidates made history in the midterms." Since November 2022, Romman is part of Georgia's first formal "Legislative Asian American Pacific Islander Caucus."

In August 2024, Romman was one of three Palestinian-American names put forward by the Uncommitted National Movement to speak at the 2024 Democratic National Convention. Upon refusal, the Uncommitted delegates staged a sit-in protest outside the doors of United Center and inside the security perimeter and stayed overnight before the last day of the convention. None of the names put forward were allowed to speak.

On November 5, 2024, Romman won re-election in Georgia State House of Representatives for House District 97.

=== 2026 gubernatorial campaign ===
On September 29, 2025, Romman announced she was running for Governor of Georgia in the 2026 election. She withdrew from the campaign on February 25, 2026, saying she saw no path to victory, and instead announced a campaign for the Georgia State Senate in the 7th district. She did not immediately endorse another candidate, but did say that that she opposed former Republican Lieutenant Governor Geoff Duncan's campaign for the Democratic nomination.
