= Prague High School (Oklahoma) =

Coordinates: 35°29′20″N 96°41′50″W

Location
- 1100 Blue Bell; Prague, Oklahoma 74864

Information
- Type: Public secondary school
- Established: 1906
- School district: Prague Public Schools
- Teaching staff: 14.64 (FTE)
- Grades: 9–12
- Enrollment: 291 (2024-2025)
- Student to teacher ratio: 19.88
- Mascot: Red Devil
- Accreditation: 1942
- Website: prague.k12.ok.us

Prague High School is the public high school serving Prague, Oklahoma. The official mascot of the school is The Red Devils.

== History ==
Located on U.S. Route 62, it is part of the Prague Public Schools district, which was founded in 1902. The high school was opened in 1906. The school's football team first played in 1915, and was undefeated during the regular season of 1917, losing only to Norman High School for the state championship. The school applied for state accreditation in 1942.

In 2012 the school and school superintendent Rick Martin were both criticized when the High School principal David Smith refused to give valedictorian Kaitlin Nootbaar her high school diploma for using the word "Hell" in her graduation speech. Many thought this was a strange 'out of proportions' reaction that caught worldwide attention. A logo of a red devil is no problem but the word 'hell' in a speech is.

== Notable alumni ==
- Stan Case - CNN broadcast news anchor
- Dalton Cooper - NFL offensive tackle for the Kansas City Chiefs
- Kyle Denney - former Cleveland Indians pitcher
