= Murder of Ahmaud Arbery =

2020 murder in Georgia, U.S.

- Pre-2013 photo of Arbery
- Location: 31°07′27″N 81°33′22″W; Satilla Shores unincorporated Glynn County, Georgia, U.S.
- Date: February 23, 2020 c. 1:15 p.m.
- Attack type: Murder, shooting, hate crime
- Victim: Ahmaud Marquez Arbery
- Perpetrators: Travis James McMichael; Gregory Johns McMichael; William Roderick Bryan, Jr.
- Motive: Anti-black racism
- Charges: State charges: Malice murder; Felony murder (4 counts); Aggravated assault (2 counts); False imprisonment; Criminal attempt to commit false imprisonment; District Attorney Jackie Johnson: Violating the oath of a public officer; Obstruction of justice; Federal charges: Interference with rights (a hate crime) (1 count each); Attempted kidnapping (1 count each); Using firearm during a crime of violence (1 count each for McMichaels)
- Verdict: All perpetrators guilty on all counts in federal trial State trial: Travis McMichael; Guilty on all charges Gregory McMichael; Not guilty of malice murder Guilty on remaining charges William Bryan; Guilty of felony murder (3 counts), aggravated assault, false imprisonment, and criminal attempt to commit false imprisonment (1 count each); Jackie Johnson: Not guilty of obstruction Oath violation charge dismissed on technicality
- Sentence: Travis McMichael Life imprisonment without the possibility of parole plus 10 years (federal); plus 20 years (state) Gregory McMichael Life imprisonment without the possibility of parole plus 7 years (federal); plus 20 years (state) William Bryan 35 years imprisonment (federal) Life imprisonment with the possibility of parole after 30 years (Note: Plus 10-year suspended sentence.) (state)

On February 23, 2020, Ahmaud Arbery, a 25-year-old black man, was murdered during a racially motivated hate crime (Note: After being convicted of murder during a State trial on November 24, 2021, the defendants were also convicted of interference with rights (a hate crime) at a federal trial on February 22, 2022.) while jogging in Satilla Shores, a neighborhood near Brunswick in Glynn County, Georgia. Three white men, who later claimed to police that they assumed he was a burglar, pursued Arbery in their trucks for several minutes, using the vehicles to block his path as he tried to run away. Two of the men, Travis McMichael and his father, Gregory McMichael, were armed in one vehicle. Their neighbor, William "Roddie" Bryan, was in another vehicle. After overtaking Arbery, Travis exited his truck, pointing his weapon at Arbery. Arbery approached Travis and a physical altercation ensued, resulting in Travis fatally shooting Arbery. Bryan recorded this confrontation and Arbery's murder on his cell phone.

Members of the Glynn County Police Department (GCPD) arrived on the scene soon after the shooting; due to Gregory McMichael's background in civil service, the responding officer referred to him on a first-name basis and no questions as to the legality of the shooting nor the validity of self-defense claims were made. Arbery was still alive at the time officers arrived on the scene. No arrests were made for more than two months. The GCPD said the Brunswick District Attorney's Office first advised them to make no arrests, then Waycross District Attorney George Barnhill twice advised the GCPD to make no arrests, once before he was officially assigned to the case, and once while announcing his intention to recuse himself due to a conflict of interest. At the behest of Gregory McMichael, a local attorney provided Bryan's video to local radio station WGIG, which published the video on May 5. The video went viral on YouTube and Twitter. The Georgia Bureau of Investigation (GBI) arrested the McMichaels on May 7 and Bryan on May 21, charging them with felony murder and other crimes.

The case was ultimately transferred to the Cobb County District Attorney's Office. On June 24, 2020, a grand jury indicted each of the three men on charges of malice murder, felony murder, and other crimes. Their trial began in November 2021 in the Glynn County Superior Court; all three were convicted on November 24 of felony murder, aggravated assault, false imprisonment, and criminal attempt to commit false imprisonment. Travis McMichael was further convicted of malice murder. On January 7, 2022, the McMichaels were sentenced to life imprisonment without the possibility of parole plus 20 years, while Bryan was sentenced to life imprisonment with the possibility of parole after 30 years. On February 22, 2022, the three men were found guilty in a federal court of attempted kidnapping and the hate crime of interference with rights, while the McMichaels were also convicted of one count of using firearms during a crime of violence.

The local authorities' handling of the case resulted in nationwide criticism and debates on racial profiling in the United States. Many religious leaders, politicians, athletes, and other celebrities condemned the incident. Georgia attorney general Christopher M. Carr formally requested the intervention of the Federal Bureau of Investigation (FBI) in the case on May 10, 2020, which was granted the following day. Former Brunswick district attorney Jackie Johnson was indicted in September 2021 for "showing favor and affection" to Gregory McMichael (her former subordinate) during the investigation, and for obstructing law enforcement by directing that Travis McMichael not be arrested. In the aftermath of the murder, Georgia enacted hate crimes legislation in June 2020, then repealed and replaced its citizen's arrest law in May 2021.

== People involved ==
- Ahmaud Marquez Arbery (May 8, 1994 – February 23, 2020), nicknamed "Maud" or "Quez", was 25 at the time of his murder. He frequently ran for exercise, including regularly in Satilla Shores, a neighborhood close to the city of Brunswick, Georgia. Arbery lived in Fancy Bluff, a historically black neighborhood across the U.S. Route 17 highway from Satilla Shores, which was around two miles (3 km) away. He graduated from Brunswick High School in 2012, where he played football. He attended South Georgia Technical College during fall 2012 and spring 2013 to train for a career as an electrician. He paused his studies to save money by working in his father's car wash and landscaping business, and had plans to re-enroll.
- Gregory Johns McMichael (born December 23, 1955), then 64, previously worked as a Glynn County Police Department (GCPD) officer from 1982 to 1989, and as an investigator for the Brunswick Judicial Circuit District Attorney's Office from 1995 to his retirement in May 2019. In 2018, McMichael helped in a shoplifting investigation involving Arbery. According to various news sources, Arbery had been caught shoplifting in a Walmart store which led to a subsequent revocation and extension of Arbery's probation. It is unknown whether McMichael remembered this when he encountered Arbery on the day of the shooting. The prosecution later said the charges had nothing to do with his murder.
- Travis James McMichael (born January 18, 1986), then 34, was a U.S. Coast Guard mechanic between 2007 and 2016, and had some training in law enforcement. He is the son of Gregory McMichael.
- William Roderick Bryan, Jr (born August 19, 1969), nicknamed "Roddie", then 50, was a neighbor of the McMichaels. Bryan was a mechanic and worked at a local hardware store in Brunswick according to posts on his social media.

== Video of the murder ==
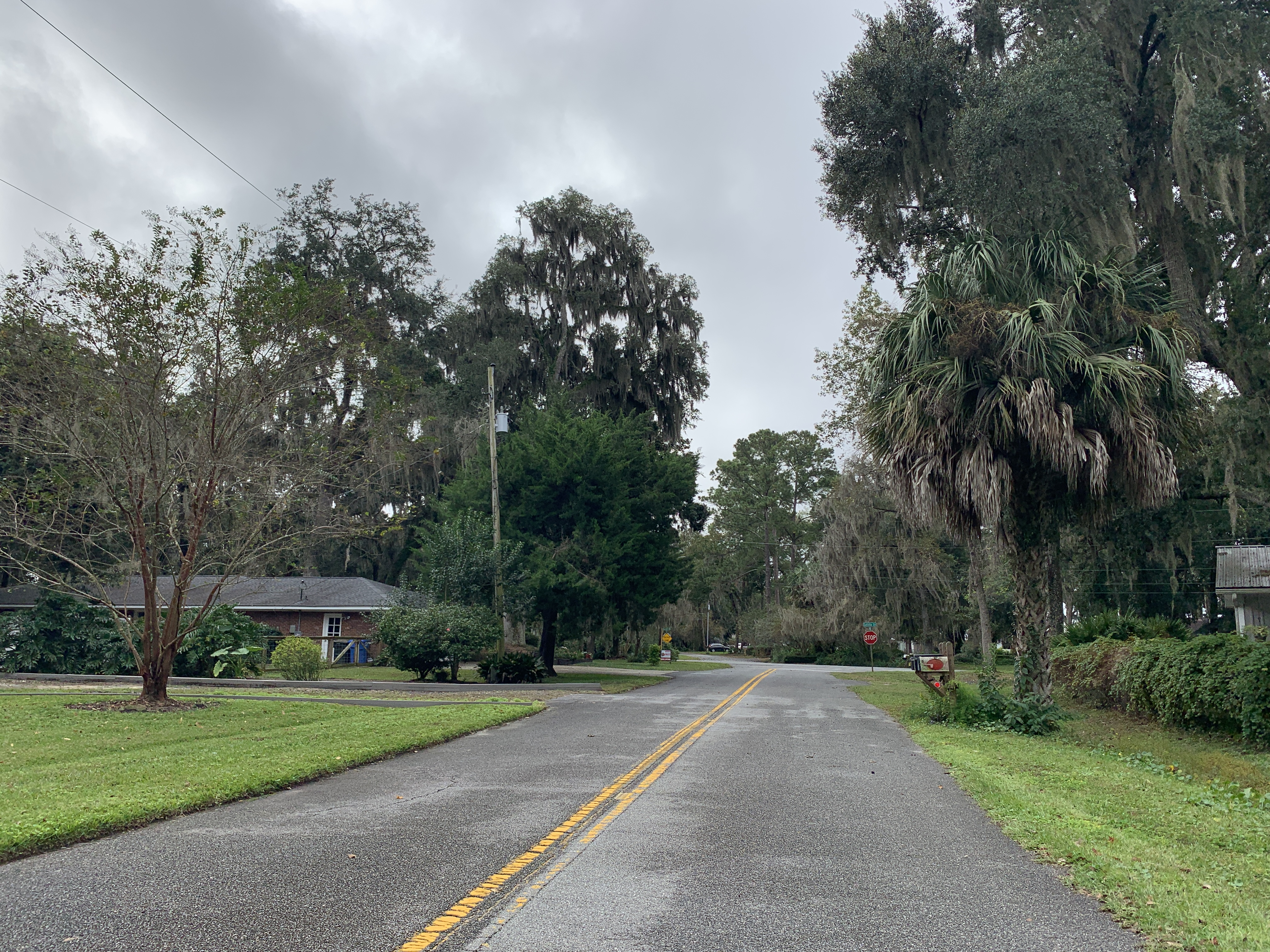
Location of Ahmaud Arbery shooting

A video of the murder was recorded by Bryan using his cellphone from his vehicle as he followed Arbery jogging down the neighborhood road. The video showed Arbery jogging on the left side of the road when he encountered a white pickup truck, a thirteenth generation Ford F-150, that had stopped in the right lane. Gregory McMichael is standing in the truck bed, while Travis McMichael initially stands beside the driver's door with a shotgun. Bryan's vehicle comes to a stop behind Arbery and the pickup truck.

As Arbery approaches the pickup truck, shouting can be heard. Arbery then crosses from the left side of the road to the right side and runs around the passenger's side of the truck. After passing the truck's front, Arbery turns left. Meanwhile, Travis McMichael, holding his shotgun, approaches Arbery at the truck's front. The camera's view of the confrontation between Arbery and Travis is momentarily blocked.

Several media accounts of the video report that the audio of the first gunshot seems to be heard before Arbery and Travis struggle with each other. Some media accounts first report a struggle, and then mention the gunshot(s). Other media accounts describe that it was "not possible" to see from the video what was happening when the first gunshot was fired, or report that the truck "blocks the view of how the men first engage each other" with regard to when the gunshot is heard.

Travis and Arbery are seen to grapple over the shotgun. While struggling, both men disappear off camera view on the left side of the frame, after which the audio of a second gunshot is heard. When they reappear, Arbery throws punches and tries to grab the shotgun. A third gunshot is heard being fired by Travis at point-blank range as Arbery appears to throw a right-handed punch at his head. Arbery recoils, stumbles, and collapses face down in the middle of the road while Travis walks away. Gregory McMichael, who has taken out a handgun but has not fired, runs towards his son and Arbery.

== Investigation by Glynn County Police ==
=== Prior thefts and trespassing incidents reported ===
In December 2019 and January 2020, residents of Satilla Shores reported three break-ins or thefts. On December 8, 2019, a Satilla Shores resident reported rifles stolen from the resident's unlocked car. Police recorded a theft on December 28, 2019. On January 1, 2020, Travis McMichael filed a report of a firearm stolen from his unlocked truck.

On February 11, 2020, Travis called 911 to report a slender six-foot-tall (1.83 m) black man with short hair, wearing red shorts and a white shirt, who was trespassing on the site of a house under construction. Travis said, "I've never seen this guy before in the neighborhood". The dispatcher asked whether Travis was OK, and he said, "Yeah, it just startled me. When I turned around and saw him and backed up, he reached into his pocket and ran into the house. So I don't know if he's armed or not. But he looked like he was acting like he was." "We've been having a lot of burglaries and break-ins around here lately", Travis said on the call. He told the dispatcher that he was out in his truck, and that as many as four neighbors were out looking for the man. His father Gregory was one of the people out searching that night, and Gregory and at least one other neighbor were armed. Police responded and searched the house along with a neighbor, but found no one. However, surveillance video from that evening showed a man who reportedly looked like Arbery, briefly walking in and out of the house under construction. He did not take anything. The under-construction house did not have doors or windows.

No evidence has emerged of Arbery committing burglaries or thefts in Satilla Shores.

=== Security cameras and 911 calls before the shooting ===
On February 23, in the minutes before the shooting, a security camera installed on a residence across the street from the house under construction, recorded a man identified by his family as Arbery walking down the road and into the house. A second security camera installed within the house recorded a man, identified as Arbery by his family, looking at the interior of the house. Approximately five minutes later, he left and began jogging down the street. After the man left the house, the first camera on the residence across the street showed a white pickup heading in the man's direction, followed a few minutes later by two police cars. The owner of the home under-construction later revealed that no crimes were committed on the property.

Two calls to the Glynn-Brunswick 911 dispatcher were made just before the shooting. In the first, a then-unidentified male caller said another man was in a house that was "under construction". The 911 dispatcher asked if the man was "breaking into it right now?" The caller replied: "No ... it's all open." After the caller said the man was now "running down the street", the dispatcher said police would respond. The dispatcher asked at 1:08 p.m., "I just need to know what he was doing wrong. Was he just on the premises and not supposed to be?" The caller responded, with some parts garbled, saying: "And he's been caught on camera a bunch at night. It's kind of an ongoing thing." The caller identified the man as a "black guy, white T-shirt". The first caller was later identified in court as neighbor Matthew Albenze.

In the second call, beginning at 1:14 p.m., a male caller said: "I'm out here at Satilla Shores ...There's a black male running down the street." The 911 dispatcher asked, "Where at Satilla Shores?" The caller replied: "I don't know what street we're on." The caller shouted, "Stop! ... Watch that. Stop, damn it! Stop!" The dispatcher tried to speak to the caller but did not receive a reply for several minutes. The caller later hung up. The second caller was later identified in court as Gregory McMichael.

=== Responding officer's report ===
The GCPD reached the scene immediately after the fatal shooting. The responding officer's report relied almost entirely on an interview with Gregory McMichael, who was described as a witness.

Gregory said he was in his yard when he saw an unidentified man running by. He said he recognized the man from a prior incident "the other night", when he said he saw the man reach into his pants as if for a weapon. He called to his son Travis and said, "The guy is running down the street; let's go". Gregory brought a .357 Magnum revolver, while Travis brought a shotgun in their pickup truck. The McMichaels said they pursued the man because he resembled a suspect in a string of local burglaries. But the police said there had been only one recent theft from an unlocked car in the neighborhood.

Travis attempted to cut off the man with his truck. The man turned and began "running back in the direction from which he came". The report states that Bryan, who was erroneously identified as "Roddy [sic]", also tried to cut off the man, but failed. Gregory said he saw the unidentified man and yelled: "Stop, stop, we want to talk to you", and that they pulled up to the man, with Travis exiting the truck with the shotgun in hand. Gregory claimed the man "began to violently attack Travis" before two shots were fired. The man died at the scene after "bleeding out", the report concluded. Authorities later identified the man as Arbery.

=== Autopsy ===
The autopsy report released by the GBI ruled Arbery's death was a homicide caused by three gunshot wounds he sustained "during a struggle for the shotgun" that fired those shots. One gunshot wounded the upper left chest, one gunshot wounded the lower middle chest, and one gunshot caused a "deep, gaping" graze wound to the right wrist. There were no alcohol or drugs in Arbery's body, other than a "tiny amount" of THC, the psychoactive component of cannabis.

== Case handling by prosecutors ==
=== Brunswick Judicial Circuit District Attorney ===
The case started under the jurisdiction of Brunswick Judicial Circuit District Attorney Jackie Johnson. Because Gregory McMichael had previously worked as an investigator in her office, Johnson recused herself from further involvement in the case. On February 27, 2020, the case was transferred by the Georgia Attorney General's Office to the Waycross Judicial Circuit District Attorney's office. The Waycross Judicial Circuit is south of Brunswick Judicial Circuit.

On March 8, two Glynn County commissioners, citing discussions with Glynn County police, accused Johnson, or her office, of preventing the McMichaels' immediate arrest. Commissioner Allen Booker said: "The police at the scene went to her, saying they were ready to arrest both of them. These were the police at the scene who had done the investigation. She shut them down to protect her friend [Gregory] McMichael." Commissioner Peter Murphy said that officers who responded at the scene had concluded that there was probable cause to make an arrest, but when they contacted Johnson's office, they "were told not to make the arrest."

Johnson's office said that Johnson did not "have any conversation with any GCPD officer about this case" on February 23, and that "no Assistant District Attorney in the office directed any Glynn County police officer not to make an arrest". Johnson's office also blamed the GCPD for being "unable to make a probable cause determination on its own" and argued that it was the local police's responsibility, not the District Attorney's responsibility, to make arrests. It is common for police to consult with the district attorney's office in the aftermath of homicides or other complex cases.

On May 9, the GCPD said that on February 23 the Brunswick District Attorney's Office "became involved in the investigation ... The McMichaels were deemed not to be flight risks and officers were advised by the [Brunswick District Attorney's Office] that no arrests were necessary at the time."

On February 28, 2022, it was reported that the state bar dismissed complaints filed by Georgia lawmakers against former Brunswick Judicial Circuit District Attorney Jackie Johnson and Waycross Judicial Circuit DA George Barnhill.

=== Waycross Judicial Circuit District Attorney ===
The GCPD said that on February 24, Waycross Judicial Circuit District Attorney George Barnhill told them that the murder of Arbery "was justifiable homicide." According to a memorandum written by Barnhill to the GCPD on April 2, Barnhill gave the GCPD "an initial opinion the day after the shooting" on February 24. In the April 2 memorandum, Barnhill wrote: "The autopsy supports the initial opinion we gave you on February 24, at the briefing room in the Glynn County Police Department after reviewing the evidence you had at that time. We do not see grounds for an arrest of any of the three parties." But, according to the Office of the Georgia Attorney General on May 10, Barnhill had not yet been appointed to handle Arbery's case on February 24, and he had not put in a request to handle the case.

The Georgia Attorney General's Office on May 10 identified the following events as having happened on February 27: the Georgia Attorney General's Office received the request from Johnson's office to transfer Arbery's case to another prosecutor. On the same day, the Georgia Attorney General's Office appointed Barnhill as the presiding prosecutor. Neither Johnson nor Barnhill informed the Georgia Attorney General's Office that Barnhill had already actively participated in the case by reviewing evidence and giving his opinion on whether arrests should occur.

On April 1, Arbery's autopsy report was given to Barnhill. On April 2, Barnhill wrote a memorandum to Glynn County police, recommending that no arrests be made. Barnhill wrote that the McMichaels were within their rights to chase "a burglary suspect, with solid firsthand probable cause"; that "Arbery initiated the fight"; and that Travis McMichael "was allowed to use deadly force to protect himself" when "Arbery grabbed the shotgun".

Barnhill cited Georgia's citizen arrest law, dating to the Civil War era, as justifying the murder of Arbery (the Georgia law says that either a crime must be committed within the citizen's "immediate knowledge", or there must be "reasonable and probable grounds of suspicion" for a felony crime). Barnhill alleged that videos of Arbery entering the home under construction on the day of the shooting showed Arbery "burglarizing a home immediately preceding the chase and confrontation."

The attorneys representing the Arbery family responded: "This video is consistent with the evidence already known to us. Ahmaud Arbery was out for a jog. He stopped by a property under construction where he engaged in no illegal activity and remained for only a brief period. Ahmaud did not take anything from the construction site. He did not cause any damage to the property. He remained for a brief period of time and was not instructed by anyone to leave but rather left on his own accord to continue his jog. Ahmaud's actions at this empty home under construction were in no way a felony under Georgia law. This video confirms Mr. Arbery's murder was not justified, meaning the actions of the men who pursued him and ambushed him were unjustified."

The owner of the unfinished home, who was 90 miles (140 kilometers) away at the time of the shooting, later said, "I've never had a police report [on my property], or anything stolen from my property, or any kind of robbery." Barnhill wrote that "Arbery's mental health and prior convictions help explain his apparent aggressive nature and his possible thought pattern to attack an armed man." Lastly, Barnhill informed the Glynn County police that he was going to recuse from the case due to connections between his son and Gregory McMichael.

On April 7, Barnhill wrote to Georgia's Attorney General, Christopher M. Carr, saying Arbery's "family are not strangers to the local criminal justice system", noting that Arbery's brother and cousins had encounters with the law. Barnhill told Carr that there was "video of Arbery burglarizing a home immediately preceding the chase and confrontation".

The Georgia Attorney General's Office on May 10 said the following events happened on April 7: it received a request from Barnhill's office to transfer Arbery's case to another prosecutor, and Barnhill revealed that he had learned "about 3–4 weeks ago" that Arbery had previously been prosecuted by his son, a prosecutor for the Brunswick Circuit District Attorney's Office, in an earlier case. He also said that one of the defendants had served as an investigator on the same prosecution (this is a reference to Gregory McMichael, who was employed by the Brunswick D.A.'s Office). The request did not explain why Barnhill had delayed in recusing his office from the case, did not mention that Barnhill had advised Glynn County police on April 2 to make no arrests, and omitted Barnhill's involvement on February 24, instead recounting only his involvement "upon taking the case".

On April 13, after Barnhill's recusal, the Georgia Attorney General's Office appointed Atlantic Judicial Circuit District Attorney Tom Durden to take over the handling of the case. The Atlantic Judicial Circuit is the immediately adjacent circuit to the north of Brunswick Judicial Circuit.

=== Atlantic Judicial Circuit District Attorney ===
==== Video of the shooting released ====
A video of the shooting was uploaded on May 5 on the website of local radio station, WGIG; it was received from Gregory McMichael. After two hours, WGIG removed the video for being too graphic.

The video was uploaded to YouTube that day. The Arbery family's attorney posted a 28-second segment of the video on Twitter. The video of the shooting went viral. Glynn County police requested the Georgia Bureau of Investigation look into how the video was publicized. The Guardian published an edited version of the video on May 6. TMZ published a longer version of the video on May 5.

On May 7, Alan David Tucker, a local criminal defense attorney, said that he had sent the cell phone video to WGIG, and that it had been recorded by William "Roddie" Bryan, who was in the second truck following Arbery. WGIG confirmed that Tucker had provided the video to the radio station. Tucker had informally consulted with the suspects in the case, but said he had not been retained to represent anyone involved. Tucker said that he released the video to provide "absolute transparency" due to "erroneous accusations and assumptions", and that "my purpose was not to exonerate them or convict them."

Within hours of the video becoming public, Tom Durden, the district attorney for Georgia's Atlantic Judicial Circuit, said that he would present the case to "the next available grand jury in Glynn County" to decide if charges should be filed. The convening of grand juries had been postponed until after June 12 due to the COVID-19 pandemic. Durden accepted Georgia Governor Brian Kemp's offer to bring in the Georgia Bureau of Investigation (GBI) to investigate.

==== Charges filed ====
The GBI found probable cause to charge Gregory and Travis McMichael within 36 hours of taking over jurisdiction of the case, and, on May 7, arrested and charged them with felony murder. (Note: A felony murder, under Georgia law, is a killing committed during the commission of a felony; an intent to kill is not a required element of felony murder.) The McMichaels were booked into the Glynn County Jail. At an appearance before a judge the following day, the McMichaels were both denied bond.

Given the "size and magnitude" of the investigation, Durden requested that the case be reassigned to another prosecutor with a larger staff. Pursuant to Durden's request, the Georgia Attorney General's office reassigned the case on May 11 to the Cobb County District Attorney's Office, led by Joyette M. Holmes. She was the fourth D.A. to take on the case. Arbery's family welcomed the transfer of the case from a southeast Georgia district attorney to one in the metro Atlanta area 300 miles (480 km) away.

=== Cobb Judicial Circuit District Attorney ===
The Cobb County District Attorney's Office, led by Joyette M. Holmes, brought charges against the defendants. On May 21, 2020, William "Roddie" Bryan was charged with felony murder and attempt to commit false imprisonment. According to the arrest warrant, Bryan tried "to confine and detain" Arbery without legal authority by "utilizing his vehicle on multiple occasions" before Arbery was shot. The GBI said their investigators found "a number of pieces of video" that linked Bryan to the case. Bryan was alleged to have attempted to block Arbery, which was unsuccessful, and struck Arbery with his pickup truck while chasing him. Arbery's palm print was found on the rear door of Bryan's truck, cotton fibers near the truck bed were attributed to contact with Arbery, and a dent was found below the location of the cotton fibers.

At the June 4, 2020 preliminary hearing, a Glynn County Magistrate Court judge ruled that there was probable cause for the murder charges against all three men. The prosecution presented additional evidence to the court to support the murder charges, including hours of testimony from the lead GBI investigator. At the hearing, the prosecutor said that the three men "chased, hunted down and ultimately executed" Arbery. The investigator testified that none of the three had called 911 prior to the chase; he said:

I don't believe it was self-defense by Mr. McMichael. I believe it was self-defense by Mr. Arbery. I believe Mr. Arbery was being pursued, and he ran until he couldn't run anymore. And it was: turn his back to a man with a shotgun, or fight with his bare hands against a man with a shotgun, and he chose to fight.

The prosecution also introduced a statement to the GBI by William Bryan that Travis McMichael used a racist slur, "fucking nigger", while standing over Arbery's body, and testimony that Travis McMichael had previously used the same slur on previous occasions in social media postings and in text messages. During the Glynn County trial, the allegation of Travis stating "fucking nigger" was not brought forth to the jury since the only witness, William Bryan, chose not to testify during the trial. By the time legal arguments had concluded, the judge did not make a ruling on whether the social media posts and text messages could be used, so they were not introduced either.

The use of racist slurs by Bryan and by both McMichaels in public social media posts and text messages were confirmed in an analysis presented to a jury by an FBI intelligence analyst; however, this information was not presented as evidence in the murder trial. Although there may have been some overlap in witnesses between the two cases, the federal trial was independent of the state trial and not affected by the state trial's outcome. Other evidence that ultimately was not shown by prosecutors in the state trial (and which was available for consideration in the federal trial) included images of the Confederate flag on the McMichaels' truck.

On June 24, 2020, a Glynn County grand jury indictment was released against all three defendants, each on nine counts: malice murder, four counts of felony murder, two counts of aggravated assault, false imprisonment and criminal attempt to commit false imprisonment.

At a hearing in July 2020, the three defendants waived arraignment and pleaded not guilty. During the hearing the lead prosecutor disclosed that Arbery's palm print had been found on the side of Bryan's truck and texts taken from Bryan's cellphone were "replete with racist remarks." At the conclusion of the hearing, the judge denied bond to Bryan.

In August 2020, attorneys for the McMichaels and Bryan filed motions seeking release on bond and dismissal of the charges. In November 2020, the court denied the McMichaels' request for bond. In January 2021, the court denied Bryan's second request for bond.

== State trial ==
The trial took place in the Glynn County Superior Court in Brunswick. After every Brunswick Judicial Circuit judge recused themselves from the case, Chatham County Superior Court Judge Timothy Walmsley became the trial judge.

=== Pretrial rulings ===
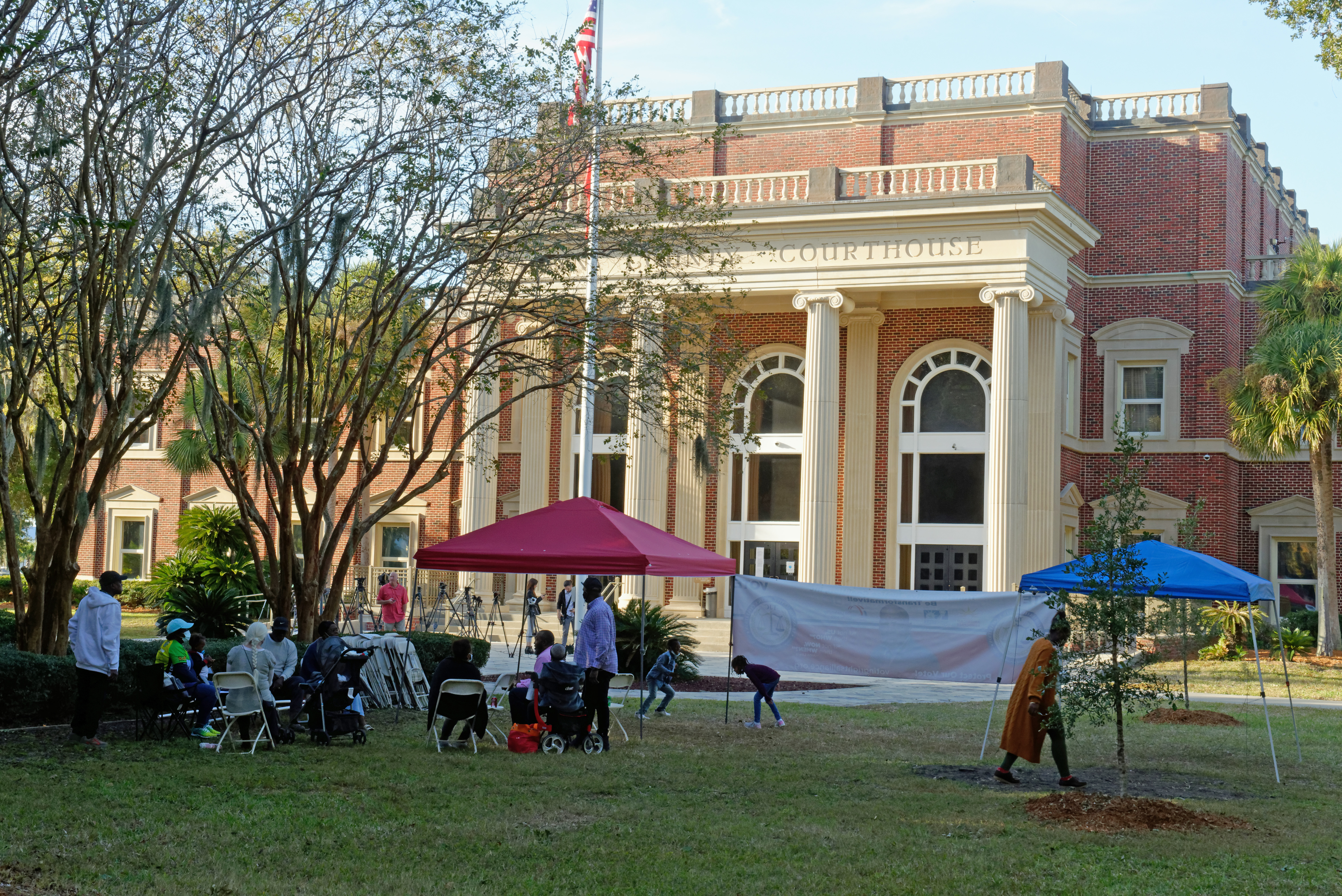
People gathered outside the courthouse on November 10, 2021

Judge Walmsley made the following pre-trial rulings in 2021:

- He denied a prosecution motion to bar testimony that the neighborhood was "on edge" at the time of the murder.
- He ruled that the defense could not introduce evidence of Arbery's prior "bad acts", noting that the McMichaels were unaware of Arbery's past at the time of the murder. He justified his ruling by stating that the "character of the victim is neither relevant nor admissible in a murder trial", and that such evidence might also mislead the jury into thinking that Arbery's murder was "somehow justified" on potential "future dangerousness".
- He ruled that the defense could not introduce Arbery's mental health records as evidence, citing Arbery's medical privacy. Walmsley also stated that a nurse's 2018 diagnosis of Arbery having mental illness was "highly questionable" and may unfairly prejudice the jury.
- He ruled that the prosecution could let the jury listen to recorded phone calls made by the jailed McMichaels, and issued a limited gag order on trial lawyers not to comment on inadmissible evidence, including evidence they "should reasonably know" would be ruled inadmissible at trial.
- He excluded evidence of "minute" amounts of THC detected in Arbery's body after his autopsy, excluded testimony of two use of force experts which the defense wanted to use regarding Travis McMichael's Coast Guard training, and excluded the introduction of graphic footage of a dying Arbery.
- He excluded evidence that Arbery was on probation when he was murdered, and allowed the introduction into evidence of photos and videos of a Confederate flag symbol on the truck that Travis McMichael used to pursue Arbery.

=== Jury selection ===
The trial of the McMichaels and Bryan in the Superior Court before Judge Walmsley began October 18, 2021, with jury selection. The jury selection process was lengthy and proceeded slowly, with the 600 potential jurors (members of the venire) questioned on what they had heard about the case and whether they had formed a belief about the guilt or innocence of the defendant, and many prospective jurors were dismissed. Judge Walmsley denied a defense motion to limit demonstrations near the courthouse, citing the demonstrators' First Amendment rights; the judge, however, expressed concern about social media posts that were "identifying jurors" or attempting "to influence the public".

On November 3, 2021, jury selection was completed. Twelve jurors and four alternates were selected. Of the 16 members, one was a black man, three were white men, and 12 were white women. The defense struck 11 of 12 prospective black jurors, the defense leaving the one black man from the qualified panel, while the prosecution used all 12 of its allotted strikes on white potential jurors. Judge Walmsley rejected a prosecution motion alleging that the defense had used its strikes in a racially discriminatory way. Only one black person ended up serving on the jury, despite Glynn County's nearly 27% black population.

=== Opening statements ===
Opening statements for the state and the McMichaels were made on November 5, 2021. Opening statements for William "Roddie" Bryan were delivered on November 18, 2021, after the prosecution rested its case.

Prosecutor Linda Dunikoski said the murder of Arbery arose from the defendants' "assumptions and driveway decisions ... Not on facts, not on evidence". She stated that the defendants did not have "immediate knowledge" of Arbery committing a crime that day, referencing Gregory McMichael's police statement where he said he did not know if Arbery had committed a break-in. She also highlighted that twelve days before the murder, Glynn County police officer Robert Rash had relayed to the McMichaels a statement from the under-construction house's owner that Arbery "has never stolen or taken anything from his property". Dunikoski described that Arbery was "under attack" by the defendants during the chase on the day of his murder, alleging that William "Roddie" Bryan had attempted to hit Arbery with his truck four times, that Gregory McMichael told Arbery "Stop or I'll blow your fucking head off", that Gregory later described Arbery as "trapped like a rat" as a result of the chase, and that Travis McMichael had "stepped around that open door and moved toward" Arbery during the final confrontation.

Bob Rubin, the lawyer for Travis McMichael, stated that although there was "no crime committed" in the presence of the McMichaels, "there was probable cause to believe a felony had been committed" by Arbery and that he "was attempting to escape." Rubin described the Satilla Shores neighborhood as "on edge" due to property crimes, arguing that Travis had a "duty and responsibility to protect himself and his neighborhood." Rubin stated that Travis killed Arbery "in self-defense", because if Arbery had taken Travis's gun, either Travis or Gregory would be dead.

Frank Hogue, the lawyer for Gregory McMichael, stated that Gregory correctly recognized Arbery from prior videos of Arbery entering the under-construction house, and that "Greg had sound reasons to believe theft had occurred – burglary".

Kevin Gough, the lawyer for William "Roddie" Bryan, stated that Bryan "had no intent to strike or injure" Arbery, while noting that Bryan had not taken his rifle along for the chase. Gough argued that there was "scant evidence" that Bryan attempted to "conceal or minimize his involvement" in the incident, because Bryan did not dispose of the cellphone video of the chase and shooting; Bryan instead passed the video to the police.

=== Evidence presentation by the state ===
The prosecution presented evidence from November 5 to November 16, 2021.

==== Law enforcement ====
Robert Rash, a Glynn County police officer, testified that (1) after speaking to Larry English, the owner of the under-construction house, Rash had been searching for Arbery to warn him against trespassing; (2) having known Gregory McMichael professionally, Rash in December 2019 discussed the "unidentified black male" with Greg. At Gregory's suggestion, Rash shared Gregory's cellphone with English, because Rash wanted Gregory to be "an expert witness to be on the phone with 911" to help identify Arbery; (3) Rash never deputized Gregory or gave him any authority; (4) Rash later shared security camera videos of Arbery with the McMichaels 12 days before the murder, while telling the McMichaels that English "hasn't seen him actually take anything"; (5) also at that time, Rash told the McMichaels about a gun theft incident "down the road" that did not involve Arbery: "we got on video the car that people come in and stole them, they were from another neighborhood."

Ricky Minshew, who was a Glynn County police officer at the time of the murder, testified he was seconds away from the scene at the time of the shots, having responded to a non-emergency report about a "suspicious black male" leaving a home under construction. Minshew said he arrived at the scene seeing Arbery in a pool of blood and heard a "death rattle" from Arbery, but did not render medical attention as he did not have "adequate medical training" to handle such a serious injury, and also because there were no "police units to watch my back" when he arrived. Minshew testified that he questioned William "Roddie" Bryan at the scene, where Bryan said the following: (1) that he was not familiar with Arbery or the McMichaels when Bryan joined the chase; (2) that he was not sure if Arbery did anything wrong; (3) that he did not know if he should have chased Arbery at all; (4) that he tried to "corner" Arbery with his vehicle five times; (5) that Arbery "had to stop and catch his breath", and seemed "tired of running"; (6) that he heard one of the McMichaels shouting at Arbery: "What'd you steal? What'd you do?" during the chase.

William Duggan, a Glynn County police officer, testified that he came to the scene after hearing a "shots fired" report on his radio. The jury was shown Duggan's body camera and dashboard camera footage, which included graphic video of Arbery's body. Duggan said he attended to Arbery, intending to stop the bleeding from a large chest wound, but then realized that Arbery was already dead. Duggan said he saw Travis McMichael covered in blood and asked if Travis was OK, to which Travis replied: "No I'm not OK ... I just effing [sic] killed somebody." Duggan described Travis as very upset and cooperative.

Jeff Brandeberry, a Glynn County police officer, testified that he interviewed Gregory McMichael at the scene, who was "pretty amped up" and seemed "a little upset". Brandeberry recounted Gregory saying the following: (1) that he had seen Arbery "hauling ass down the street" past his house in a "dead run"; (2) that Arbery had been "breaking in all these houses out here ... he makes frequent trips to the neighborhood and gets caught on video cameras every third or fourth night breaking into places and no one's been able to catch him"; (3) that "a driving force in my mind is my son had a missing pistol and this guy I don't know for a fact this guy has been going over doing this crap over and over ... I saw him if I could've gotten a shot, I would have shot him myself"; (4) that the blood on Gregory's hand came from checking if Arbery had a gun; and (5) that Arbery was "an asshole. He was hooked up when he came around the corner."

Parker Marcy, a Glynn County police detective, who had interviewed Gregory McMichael at the police station later in the day of the murder, testified that Gregory told him: (1) that he had seen Arbery on surveillance videos shared by a neighbor and "had heard a description of him", but was unsure if he had seen Arbery in person before ("never" or "maybe"); (2) that he saw "two or three videos" showing "this guy breaking into or being or wandering around into this [under-construction] house ... I don't think the guy has stolen anything out of there, and if he did it was early on in this process, but he keeps going back in that house over and over again"; (3) that he considered Arbery a "prime suspect" in "numerous" forcible entries into buildings and vehicles ("Logic tells you that this guy may be the one that's doing it"); (4) he told Arbery during the chase words akin to "Stop ... I'll blow your fucking head off", because "I was trying to convey to this guy we were not playing"; (5) that Gregory had once pointed his gun at Arbery; and (6) that the chase resulted in Arbery being "cornered ... like a rat". Marcy further stated that surveillance video did not show Arbery taking anything from the under-construction house that day.

Roderic Nohilly, a Glynn County police detective who had previously known Gregory McMichael professionally, interviewed Gregory at the police station later in the day of the murder. Nohilly testified that Gregory told him: (1) "I don't know. [...] He might have", in response to Nohilly's question on whether Arbery broke into a house that day; (2) that he saw Arbery "hauling ass" past his house, "getting the hell out of there", prompting him to take his handgun and call for Travis; (3) that they "chased [Arbery] around the neighborhood for a bit, but he wasn't winded at all"; (4) that Arbery was "trapped like a rat" in the chase, "wanting to flee", but "realized ... he was not going to get away"; (5) that Arbery wanted to "grab [Travis'] gun and probably shoot Travis ... If he'd had gotten that shotgun, and there was no separation between Travis and him, I was going to cap his ass".

Stephan Lowrey, formerly a Glynn County police investigator who worked on the case, had interviewed Bryan at the police station later in the day of the murder. Lowrey testified that Bryan told him: (1) that he had seen Arbery "running down the road" with a truck "following", so Bryan entered his own vehicle to "assist"; (2) that he had not seen Arbery before and did not know if Arbery was involved with "any past instances", (3) that during the chase, he tried to cut off Arbery multiple times, "angled" Arbery "off the side of the road", but "didn't hit him"; and (4) that Arbery was trying to open Bryan's truck door during the chase. Lowrey further testified that Arbery's fingerprints were found on Bryan's truck door, next to a dent in the truck's body. Regarding the status of the Glynn County investigation before the Georgia Bureau of Investigation takeover, Lowrey said that it could be described as "inactive".

Jason Seacrist, a Georgia Bureau of Investigation agent, who interviewed Bryan in May 2020, testified that (1) Bryan said he "didn't know for sure" if Arbery did something wrong, but "instinct" indicated Arbery did, and Bryan ultimately "figured he stole something"; (2) compared to his earlier interviews, Bryan played down his involvement in the chase in the later interview, stating that he wanted to slow Arbery down and take a picture of Arbery to identify him to the police.

Richard Dial, a Georgia Bureau of Investigation agent, led the organization's investigation into Arbery's murder. Dial testified that (1) Bryan's behavior was not that of a "witness", as he was "pursuing" Arbery and "trying to box him in between two different vehicles"; (2) during the chase, Bryan had to reverse his vehicle to continue his pursuit of Arbery after Arbery turned into another street and Bryan overshot the turn. Maps compiled by the Georgia Bureau of Investigation showed that the McMichaels' vehicle looped around to the other end of the street Arbery was on, such that Arbery was between Bryan and the McMichaels, with no way to leave the street without meeting one of their vehicles.

Other Georgia Bureau of Investigation members who testified were (1) Lawrence Kelly, who analyzed phone records and concluded that Bryan did not communicate with the McMichaels on the day of the shooting or before; (2) Jesse Worley, who said that Arbery's fingerprints were found on Bryan's truck; (3) Anne Kisler-Rao, who said that fibers from the side of Bryan's truck were consistent with those of Arbery's shirt, (4) Brian Leppard, who said that Travis' shotgun was fired very close to Arbery's armpit, close enough to touch Arbery's shirt and close enough for Arbery to possibly grab.

==== Other ====
During testimony by Cara Richardson, director of the Glynn-Brunswick 911 call center, several calls were played for the jury to hear. In July 2019, Gregory McMichael reported "a lot of break-ins in this area, automobile break-ins. And my son and I just discovered" a male suspect, "he may be living under Bluff Creek bridge ... We just made contact with him". Other calls made by Travis McMichael in January 2020 and mid-February 2020 were also played, as well as a call by Gregory McMichael at the time of the incident.

Security camera videos showed the jury that Arbery had visited Larry English's under-construction house five times between October 2019 to February 2020. The videos showed that Arbery had no bag, and he did not touch or take any items from the house. The jury also saw more security camera footage from the house, displaying other incidents of two white boys taking plywood from the property's garage, and separately, a white man and woman entering the house at night with a small bag. English made multiple 911 calls regarding the white couple, once saying: "I know that first time they went in and stole", from the boat at his property. English also called 911 over Arbery in 2019, describing him as a "trespasser". Citing ill health, English did not testify live in court, but instead a September 2021 video deposition of his was shown to the jury. English testified in his deposition that (1) people frequently explored his under-construction house; (2) he called 911 on Arbery in 2019 wanting police to tell Arbery "not to be there anymore"; (3) he barely knew the McMichaels and had never met William Bryan; (4) as to whether he told the McMichaels about incidents at his house – "probably", but "not sure"; (5) he had not authorized the McMichaels to confront anyone on his property; and (6) he did authorize a different neighbor (not Bryan) to check his property.

Kellie Parr, whose parents are residents of Satilla Shores, testified that in either December 2019 or January 2020, she saw a man at the under-construction house, whom she now believes to be Arbery. Parr said that the man was "just standing in the door frame and we just kind of looked at each other as I drove by", and that the man "didn't like hide or anything".

Matthew Albenze, a Satilla Shores resident, testified that (1) he saw Arbery "just looking around" inside the under-construction house on the day of the murder; (2) in reaction to that, he put a handgun in his pocket, and called the police non-emergency number from across the street; (3) he chose not to call 911 because he "did not see an emergency"; (4) that Arbery ran off during Albenze's call, to which Albenze said: "I don't know why he took off running. I don't know if he saw me or not". Albenze's call was played to the jury.

Edmund Donoghue, the state medical examiner who conducted Arbery's autopsy, testified that both the first and third shotgun blasts resulted in fatal injuries in Arbery, such that police or paramedics would not have been able to save Arbery's life. The first blast cut through Arbery's right wrist artery and pierced Arbery's chest, breaking ribs and causing massive internal bleeding; the second blast missed; and the third blast cut through a major artery and vein close to Arbery's left armpit, fracturing bones.

=== Evidence presentation by the defense ===
The defense presented testimony on November 17 and 18, 2021. Travis McMichael was the only defendant to testify; Gregory McMichael and William "Roddie" Bryan did not testify.

On the first day of his testimony, Travis testified that (1) crime had increased in the neighborhood in the months before the shooting, but he did not have complete information on who committed the crimes; (2) he was aware that items were stolen from the boat at his neighbor's under-construction property, and that he knew that "several people" had entered the property, any of whom could have stolen the items; (3) twelve days before the shooting, he saw Arbery "creeping" outside the under-construction house and he confronted Arbery, who reached towards his waistband, leading Travis to leave and call 911, because he was "not going to chase or investigate somebody who might be armed"; (4) on the day of the shooting, Gregory McMichael, in nearly a "frantic state", told Travis to "grab your gun" because "the guy who has been breaking in down the road" had run past their house; (5) he suspected that Arbery had been caught "breaking in" or been involved in an "altercation". (6) when he and his father chased Arbery in Travis's vehicle, he caught up with Arbery and recognized him as the person he saw twelve days earlier; (7) he mistakenly thought his father indicated that the police had been called; (8) he chased Arbery to ask questions, with Travis asking: "Hey, what are you doing? What's going on?---" and Arbery did not reply; (9) he continued chasing and attempted to "de-escalate" by asking Arbery to "stop", but Arbery looked "very angry", turned around, and ran in the opposite direction; (10) he caught up with Arbery again, saying that "police are on the way," causing Arbery to run faster, hence Travis became more suspicious; (11) he also chased Arbery because he wanted to "let the police know where [Arbery was] at and watch what's going on, to see where he's going;" (12) he circled the neighborhood to track Arbery, eventually seeing him running beside a black truck, which Arbery was "hitting" and "grabbing ... looked like he was trying to get in;" (13) he had not asked Bryan to join the chase and "didn't know where [Bryan's black] truck came from;" (14) he stopped his vehicle and got out, then again asked his father if he had called police, to which his father indicated he had no phone; (15) he then saw Arbery running towards him alone, viewed Arbery as "dangerous", shouted at Arbery to "stop", and reached for his shotgun from his vehicle, to which Arbery turned around and ran away. (16) regarding the final confrontation captured on video by Bryan, he saw Arbery once again running toward him, this time followed by the black truck, so he passed his cellphone to his father; (17) thinking that Arbery was "going to attack", he pointed his shotgun at Arbery "to deter him to do not come at me;" (18) Arbery ran around Travis's vehicle from the passengers side to the front, while Travis moved from the driver's side to the front of the vehicle to ensure that he could still see Arbery, thinking that Arbery "might be armed" and was a threat to Greg; and that (19) Arbery engaged Travis at the vehicle's front, grabbing the gun and hitting him---so he shot Arbery to stop him from taking the gun.

On the second day of his testimony, Travis McMichael testified that (20) he never told Arbery that Arbery was under arrest for any crime, because "I didn't have time. I was still trying to get him to stop;" (21) later when making a statement to the police, he did not say that he and Gregory were trying to arrest Arbery; (22) until the time he aimed his shotgun at Arbery, Arbery had not verbally threatened him or displayed any weapon, but he thought Arbery "could be a threat" because of his running at him; (23) he told police that day that he "cannot remember" if Arbery had grabbed the gun when he shot him, but the account was inaccurate due to his suffering the "most traumatic event;" that regarding Facebook posts he made before the shooting, (24) in January 2019 he agreed with a neighbor who wrote that thieves should be made an example of: "That's right – hope y'all catch the vermin---" then when that neighbor indicated concern over how her father may interact with thieves because he did not care about being jailed, he responded: "That's what this world needs more of ... My old man is the same way ... Hell, I'm getting that way;" and that (25) in July 2019 he wrote "Arm up" in response to a post on local crime.

Six residents of Satilla Shores testified on behalf of the defense, relaying their perception of crime in Satilla Shores, as well as a Facebook page on Satilla Shores in which crime was discussed.

=== Closing arguments ===
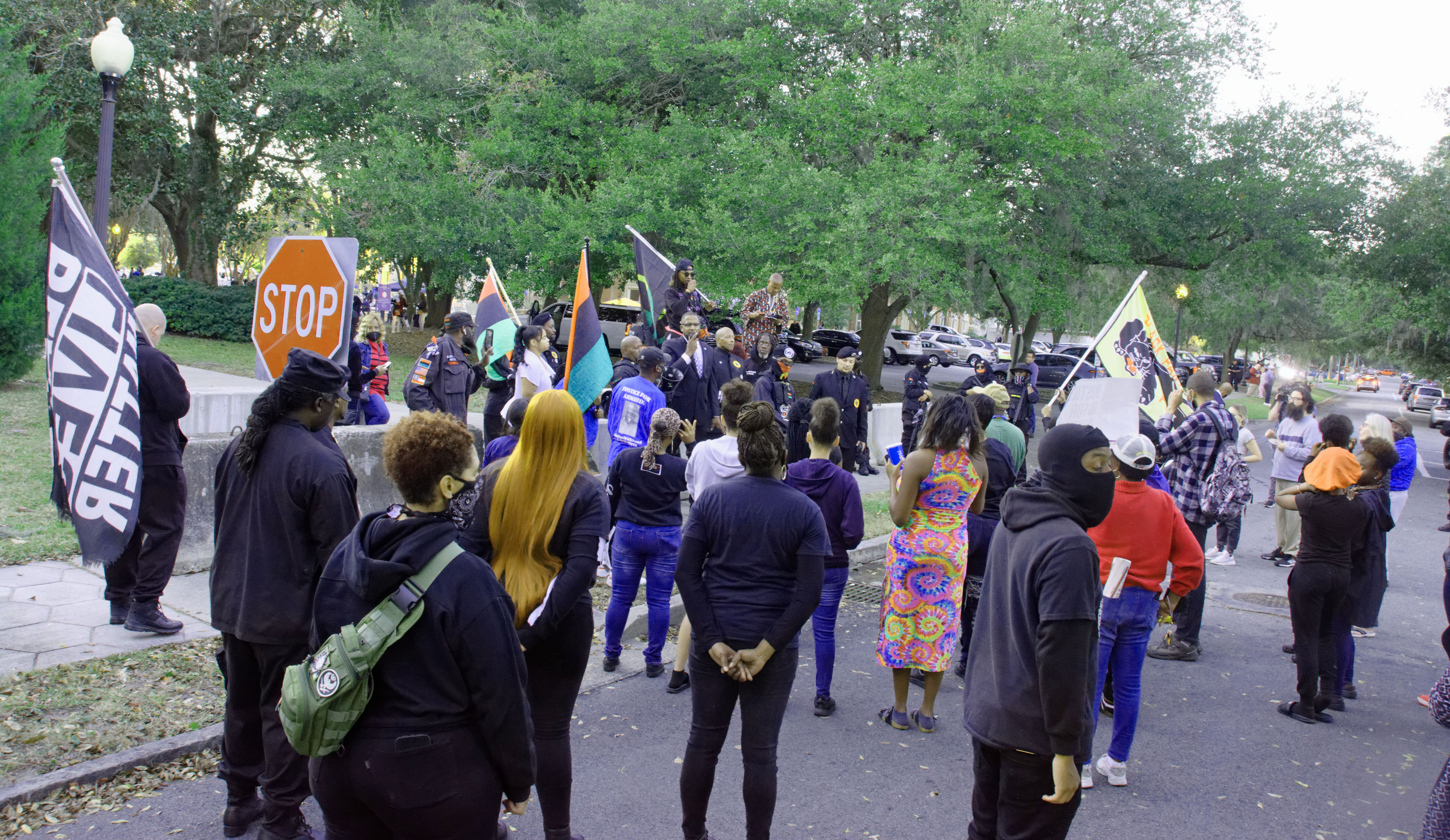
The New Black Panther Party protesting outside the courthouse on November 22, 2021

Closing arguments were made on November 22 and 23, 2021.

Prosecutor Linda Dunikoski argued that the defendants could not legally make a citizen's arrest of Arbery because they assumed he had committed a crime that day, whereas a citizen's arrest required "immediate knowledge" of a crime. She stated that the alternate requirement for a citizen's arrest, suspicion of fleeing after committing a felony, was not satisfied because at most, Arbery had trespassed, which was a misdemeanor and not a felony. Dunikoski further pointed out that Arbery had never brought "a bag, or any means to steal anything" to the under-construction house. She rejected the notion that the defendants were acting in self-defense "because they were the initial, unjustified aggressors," while noting that Travis McMichael had pointed his shotgun at Arbery. In contrast, she said Arbery had: "No weapon. No threats. No way to call for help. Didn't even have a cell phone on him. Ran away from them for five minutes."

Jason Sheffield, the lawyer for Travis McMichael, argued that under Georgia law, the felony of burglary included entering "with the intent to steal something;" thus when Travis saw Arbery at the under-construction house twelve days before the shooting, he had probable cause to believe Arbery committed burglary and could justifiably arrest him. While describing the incident as "tragic", Sheffield argued: "You are allowed to defend yourself. You are allowed to use force that is likely to cause death or serious bodily injury if you believe it's necessary."

Laura Hogue, a lawyer for Gregory McMichael, argued that "Arbery was not an innocent victim," describing him as "a recurring nighttime intruder ... frightening, and unsettling," who arrived in Satilla Shores "with no socks to cover his long dirty toenails." She said Arbery was "acting erratically when approached and making terrible, unexpected, illogical choices," failed to "stop" or "wait, to tell the police what he was doing," and ultimately died because he "chose to fight", "without any sense of reason to run at a man wielding a shotgun."

Kevin Gough, the lawyer for Bryan, argued that Bryan could not have known that the McMichaels had guns and would shoot Arbery, and that "by the time [Bryan] knew there was nothing he could do." Gough also questioned why Arbery never asked for someone to call 911, suggesting that "Arbery doesn't want help." Gough argued that if the McMichaels "were vigilantes and harbored some ill will toward" Arbery, "then what difference does it make whether Roddie Bryan was there or not?" Gough concluded by stating that Bryan's "presence is absolutely superfluous and irrelevant."

Prosecutor Linda Dunikoski delivered the final rebuttal to defense arguments. She disputed the defense arguments that the McMichaels were afraid of crime in their neighborhood, stating that their five-minute chase of Arbery proved that they were not afraid. Dunikoski described Gregory's description of Arbery "trapped like a rat" as an acknowledgment of false imprisonment, and Gregory's description of Arbery as an "asshole" just after the shooting to be evidence of malice. She concluded that all three men were responsible because they all committed felonies leading up to the murder.

=== Verdict ===
On November 24, 2021, the jury reached a verdict after 12 hours of deliberation spanning two days.

- Travis McMichael was found guilty of malice murder, four counts of felony murder, two counts of aggravated assault (with a firearm and with a pickup truck), false imprisonment, and criminal attempt to commit a felony (false imprisonment).
- Gregory McMichael was found guilty of four counts of felony murder, two counts of aggravated assault (with a firearm and with a pickup truck), false imprisonment, and criminal attempt to commit a felony (false imprisonment). He was found not guilty of malice murder.
- William "Roddie" Bryan was found guilty of three counts of felony murder, one count of aggravated assault (with a pickup truck), false imprisonment, and criminal attempt to commit a felony (false imprisonment). He was found not guilty of malice murder, not guilty of one count of felony murder, and not guilty of one count of aggravated assault (with a firearm).

A crowd outside the Glynn County courthouse cheered at the guilty verdict by the jury.

=== Sentencing ===
As a result of the verdicts, both the McMichaels and Bryan faced mandatory sentences of life imprisonment. The prosecution did not seek the death penalty in this case.

On January 7, 2022, the McMichaels were sentenced to life imprisonment with no parole and an additional 20 years, while Bryan was sentenced to life imprisonment with the possibility of parole after 30 years.

In sentencing the defendants, Judge Walmsley said "remorse is something that's felt and demonstrated", noting that "after Ahmaud Arbery fell, the McMichaels turned their backs" and "walked away". Walmsley further said that Gregory McMichael "very early on in this tried to establish a narrative", when (1) at the crime scene Gregory told Travis that he had "no choice" but to shoot, and (2) at the crime scene Gregory described Arbery as "an asshole". Walmsley indicated that Travis appeared to be more concerned about his own well-being while Arbery lay dead at the crime scene, with Travis stating: "This is the worst day of my life." In contrast, immediately after the shooting, Bryan "demonstrated that he had grave concerns that what had occurred should not have occurred", and also "did cooperate with law enforcement", said Walmsley.

== Federal trial ==
The federal trial was held at the Frank M. Scarlett Federal Building in Brunswick, Georgia.

=== Pre-trial events ===
In April 2021, all three men were indicted by a federal grand jury with one count each of interference with rights, and with one count each of attempted kidnapping. Travis McMichael and Gregory McMichael were also indicted with separate counts of using firearms during a crime of violence. The "interference with rights" charge is a hate crime, specifically claiming "that the defendants used force and threats of force to intimidate and interfere with Arbery's right to use a public street because of his race". The range of sentencing included the death penalty, life in prison, another prison sentence length, and a fine. All three men initially pleaded not guilty.

The Justice Department filed a notice of plea agreement on January 31, 2022. The deal, signed by federal prosecutors and defense attorneys for Travis and Greg McMichael, specified 30 year sentences to be served in federal prison, in exchange for guilty pleas. Travis McMichael's agreement stated that he had not set out on the day of the murder to harm anyone for racist reasons, but that he had "made assumptions" about Arbery due to his race and that race played a part in his decision to chase Arbery with a gun. He also acknowledged that in digital messages he had associated black skin with "criminality" and supported vigilantism against black criminals. Greg McMichaels was prepared to plead guilty in a subsequent session.

But Arbery's family took the unusual step of opposing the agreement in open court, begging the judge to reject the deal so that the McMichaels would serve their sentences in the Georgia state prison system, as Arbery's family considered federal prison as having more lenient conditions. Caught by surprise, Assistant Attorney General for Civil Rights Kristen Clarke released a statement saying that the plea deal had been signed only after Arbery family attorneys "informed me that the family was not opposed to it." Assistant US Attorney Tara Lyons also asserted that Arbery's family had been repeatedly consulted about the agreement and were unopposed. But District Judge Lisa Godbey Wood sided with the family, acknowledging their emotional testimony as she took the rare step of rejecting the signed plea agreement, stating that she did not have enough information at that time to know whether the 30-year sentence it specified was fair.

On February 3, Greg McMichael's lawyers indicated that he would plead not guilty; on February 4, Travis McMichael withdrew his guilty plea. Legal experts expressed concern that public reporting on the plea agreement could prejudice the jury and make it more difficult for the McMichaels to get a fair trial.

=== Evidence and testimony ===
In the federal trial, the prosecution called 20 witnesses while the defense called one witness. GBI agent Richard Dial testified that Arbery ran "just about every day", and that Arbery did not take anything or damage anything from the under-construction home. Glynn County policeman Robert Rash testified that days before the shooting he had told the McMichaels that there was no evidence that Arbery stole anything from the under-construction home.

FBI analyst Amy Vaughan testified about messages and social media posts made by Travis McMichael and William "Roddie" Bryan, which showed that Travis often described Black people as "savages" and "monkeys", linked them to criminality, and additionally stated that they "ruin everything". In January 2019, Travis wrote that a restaurant patronized by Blacks should "change the name from Cracker Barrel to Nigger Bucket"; two months later, Travis wrote that he loved his job because: "Zero niggers work with me." On social media, Travis shared a video of a young Black boy dancing, where the audio had been edited to that of a racist song entitled "Alabama Nigger" by country singer Johnny Rebel; Travis also reacted to a video of a Black man pranking a white man by declaring that he would "kill that fucking nigger", and then responded to a story about black people assaulting white women by stating that he "would beat those monkeys to death" if that was done to his family members. In other social media posts, McMichael responded to a video of Black Lives Matter protesters by wishing that he had a rifle to shoot the "goddamn monkeys", and separately called for a vehicle to drive into a group of Black people.

According to Vaughan's testimony, William "Roddie" Bryan stated on 2019's MLK Day that he was "working so all the niggers can take off", further describing the MLK Day's parade as the "monkey day parade". Bryan also stated that a Black man that his daughter was dating would "fit right in with the monkeys", and that this relationship "is the only thing I said I would never accept". Vaughan testified that the FBI could not access Gregory McMichael's phone because it was encrypted, but a social media post on Gregory's account four months before the shooting was found stating: "A gun in the hand is worth more than the entire police force on the phone."

During Vaughan's testimony, prosecutors showed a social media post made by Travis McMichael within two months of the shooting, where he posted a video of himself in front of a "No Trespassing" sign, while stating that he would be hunting on private property. Multiple videos of Travis trespassing while hunting were shown. Separately, GBI agent Jason Seacrist testified that a Confederate flag sticker was found pasted on Travis McMichael's truck, while a vanity plate with a Confederate emblem was visible on police body camera footage from the day of the shooting had been removed from Travis' truck by the time investigators accessed the truck months later.

A white woman who was a former subordinate of Travis McMichael testified that Travis repeatedly called her a "nigger lover" for dating a Black man. A woman who met Gregory McMichael in 2015 while he was working as a prosecutor's investigator testified that Gregory reacted to the death of Georgia's civil rights activist Julian Bond by wishing that Bond had died earlier, and that Gregory then said: "All those Blacks are nothing but trouble and I wish they'd all die." A neighbor of the McMichaels said that Gregory had discussed a Black tenant of his, whom Gregory described as a "walrus". Gregory said that after he shut down the property's air-conditioning to induce the tenant to pay rent, remarking: "You should have seen how fast her big fat Black ass came with the rent check".

The defense played a recording of Gregory McMichael telling police in July 2019 that he and Travis had confronted a homeless man staying under a bridge near Satilla Shores, due to their suspicion of him committing theft. The race of the homeless man was not mentioned. The defense's sole witness was a resident of Satilla Shores who said she had never met the McMichaels or Bryan. She testified that sometime in 2019, she saw an apparently Caucasian man under the same bridge, who seemed to be camping there, but she did not know if she saw the same person as the McMichaels.

=== Verdict ===
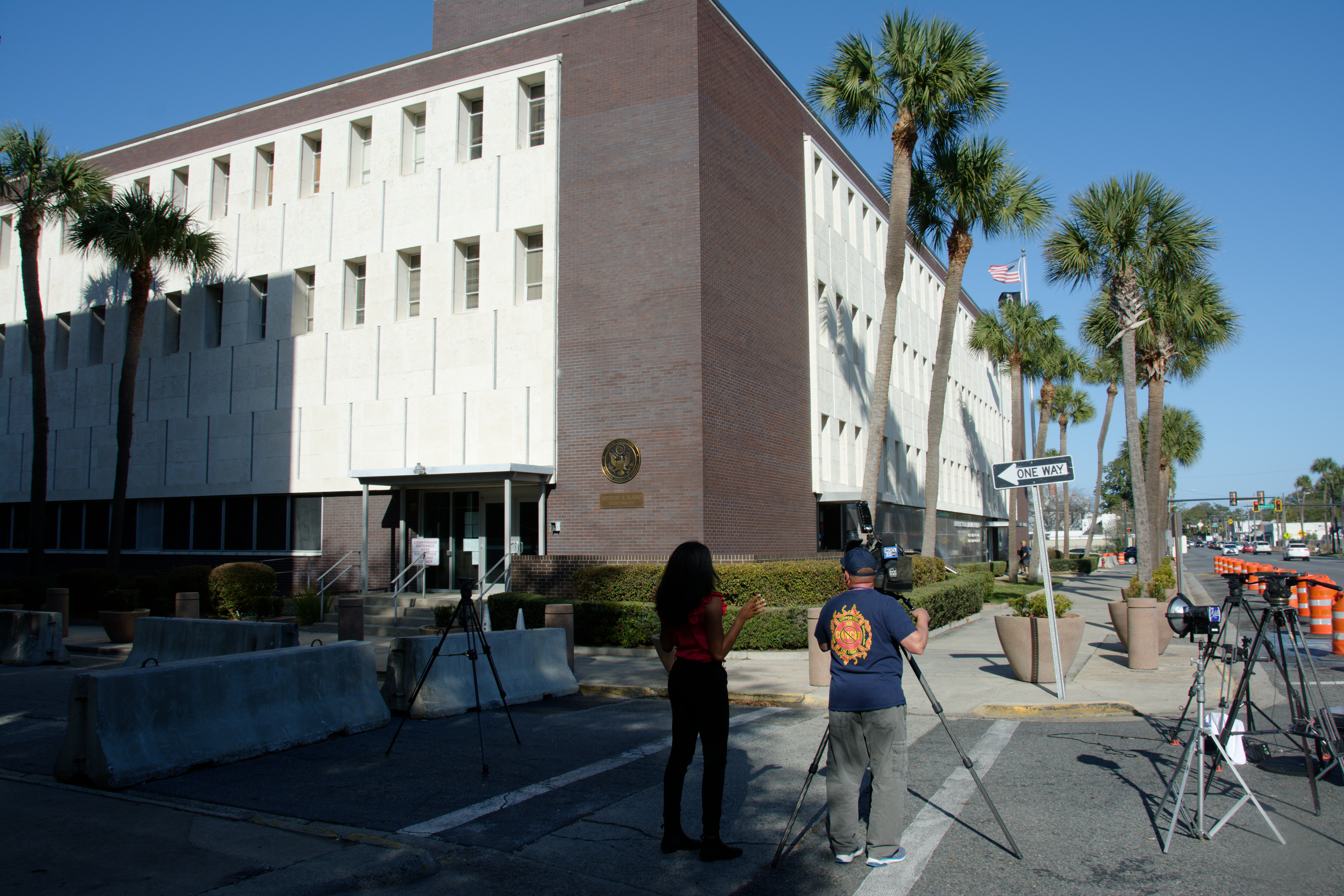
The federal courthouse during the federal trial of the McMichaels and Bryan.

On February 22, 2022, the McMichaels and Bryan were found guilty of all counts in the federal trial. A jury of eight white people, three Black people and one Hispanic person reached a verdict in just over three hours.

- All three men were found guilty of using force and threats of force to intimidate and interfere with Arbery's right to use a public street because of his race.
- All three men were found guilty of attempted kidnapping.
- Travis McMichael was found guilty of using, carrying, brandishing, and firing a gun during a crime of violence.
- Greg McMichael was found guilty of using, carrying, and brandishing a gun during a crime of violence.

=== Appeals ===
On March 8, 2022, attorneys for Travis and Greg McMichael appealed the verdict, citing that federal hate crimes laws apply only to public places, and that the crime occurred in a private street. Attorneys for Greg McMichael also appealed the conviction on targeting Arbery because he was black, citing his career as a law enforcement agent, spanning several decades, where McMichael's attorney said, there was no evidence of racist behavior.

On March 3, 2023, all three men appealed their convictions. Attorneys for William Bryan and Gregory McMichael asked for the federal conviction to be overturned on the basis that their past racist remarks about African Americans do not prove that they killed Arbery due to his race and that they both thought that Arbery was a criminal. On the same day, attorneys for Travis McMichael also filed an appeal to overturn the conviction on similar grounds of his March 2022 initial appeal. All three appeals were eventually denied on 14 November 2025 by the 11th U.S. Circuit Court of Appeals.

=== Sentencing ===
On August 8, 2022, Travis and Gregory McMichael were sentenced to second life terms for committing a federal hate crime. Travis received an additional 10 years and his father Gregory seven years in addition to their life sentences. Bryan was sentenced to 35 years in prison.

=== Incarceration ===
Travis is currently incarcerated at Hays State Prison in Trion, while Gregory is currently incarcerated at Augusta State Medical Prison in Augusta, and William is currently incarcerated at Valdosta State Prison in Valdosta, Georgia.

== Aftermath ==
=== Indictment of former DA Jackie Johnson ===
In May 2020, Georgia Attorney General Chris Carr said that his office would review how the investigation into Arbery's murder "was handled from the outset". At Carr's request, the GBI investigated whether District Attorney Jackie Johnson or District Attorney George Barnhill's actions in connection with the appointment of a conflict prosecutor to investigate the murder of Arbery constituted a crime. In November 2020, Jackie Johnson lost her bid for re-election as Brunswick District Attorney.

On September 2, 2021, Carr announced that a Glynn County grand jury had indicted ex-District Attorney Jackie Johnson on one felony count of violating the oath of a public officer "by showing favor and affection to Greg McMichael during the investigation" (Gregory was formerly her subordinate), and for being unfair to Arbery by having "recommended Barnhill to the Attorney General's Office for appointment as the case prosecutor without disclosing that she had previously sought Barnhill's assistance on the case". The grand jury also indicted Johnson on one misdemeanor count of obstruction and hindering law enforcement, in this case the Glynn County police, "by directing that Travis McMichael should not be placed under arrest." On September 8, Johnson turned herself in for arrest, and then was released from detention without needing to pay her $10,000 bond.

In response to a motion from Johnson to dismiss the charges against her, in May 2022 prosecutors submitted a response showing that Johnson engaged in 16 phone calls with defendant Greg McMichael in the period starting on the day of the shooting and extending until May 5, 2020. One of the calls lasted over 21 minutes.

Johnson's trial was scheduled to begin on January 21, 2025.

On February 3, 2025, Judge John Turner ordered the acquittal for Johnson on the obstruction charge, stating from the bench, "There is not one scintilla of evidence that I've heard that would authorize a verdict on that count." On February 5, Judge Turner granted the defense's motion citing technical flaws in the charges, and dismissed the remaining charge against Johnson of violating her oath of office.

=== Federal review of case ===
Georgia Attorney General Carr called for a federal investigation into how local investigators and authorities handled the case, including "investigation of the communications and discussions by and between the Office of the District Attorney of the Brunswick Judicial Circuit and the Office of the District Attorney of the Waycross Judicial Circuit related to this case."

The next day, the U.S. Department of Justice responded that the Justice Department's Civil Rights Division, the FBI, and the U.S. Attorney for the Southern District of Georgia "have been supporting and will continue fully to support and participate in the state investigation. We are assessing all of the evidence to determine whether federal hate crimes charges are appropriate." In April 2021, all three men were indicted for federal crimes – one count each of interference with rights (a hate crime), one count each of attempted kidnapping, and one count for each McMichael of using a firearm during a crime of violence.

=== Reporting on prior allegations of misconduct by local authorities ===
The involvement of the GCPD as the primary investigator in a case involving its former officer Gregory McMichael was controversial. Following Arbery's murder, media investigated the history of the GCPD. The New York Times noted that in preceding years, the department had "been accused of covering up allegations of misconduct, tampering with a crime scene, interfering in an investigation of a police shooting and retaliating against fellow officers who cooperated with outside investigators."

Days after Arbery was fatally shot, the chief of police—who had been brought in to clean up a police force described by the county manager in 2019 as poorly trained and characterized by a "culture of cronyism"—was indicted on charges arising from an alleged cover-up of a sexual relationship between an officer and an informant. In response to a grand jury report issued in November 2019, which had condemned the GCPD over "alleged officer misconduct and poor coordination with the local sheriff's office", State Senator William Ligon of Brunswick in early 2020 introduced legislation to allow voters to abolish the Glynn County Police Department. Although the legislation initially stalled in the General Assembly, when the legislature returned following the COVID-19 recess the House passed the legislation 152–3. The Senate then passed the legislation as Senate Bill 509, which Governor Kemp signed. The legislation allowed a November 3, 2020, binding referendum such that the police department would be abolished if a majority of Glynn County voters agreed. Nevertheless, the referendum was ruled unconstitutional by a superior court judge on September 11, 2020, so it did not appear on the November 3 ballot.

Arbery's murder also prompted re-examinations of the way prosecutions of shootings were handled by the Brunswick Judicial Circuit District Attorney's Office. In 2010, two police officers fatally shot an unarmed white woman through her car windshield. Four former prosecutors, who had worked under Brunswick Judicial Circuit District Attorney Jackie Johnson, alleged that Johnson shielded the officers from criminal prosecution. A 2015 investigation by WSB-TV revealed that Johnson had agreed to withhold a draft murder indictment from the grand jury and had "allowed the officers' department to present a factually inaccurate animation they created showing the car escaping through a gap and running over the officers."

=== Hate crimes law enacted ===
In late June 2020, Georgia enacted new bipartisan hate crimes legislation (House Bill 426). Previous versions of the legislation had passed the state House but failed to pass the state Senate. Arbery's murder was a catalyst for passage of the bill; at the time Georgia was one of just four states without any hate-crimes legislation, as the Georgia Supreme Court had struck down a previous hate crimes law in 2004. The law requires a higher sentence for defendants convicted of targeting a victim due to "actual or perceived race, color, religion, national origin, sex, sexual orientation, gender, mental disability, or physical disability."

=== Citizen's arrest law repealed and replaced ===
On February 16, 2021, exactly a week before the first anniversary of Arbery's murder, Georgia Governor Brian Kemp announced he would introduce legislation that would significantly amend the state's citizen's arrest law. Georgia's citizen's arrest law had been textually very broad in scope, dating back to the Civil War era. The legal defense argued by the defendants accused of murdering Arbery was that they were only attempting to perform a lawful citizen's arrest. Kemp criticized the law for being outdated and vague. According to Kemp, the changes would close numerous loopholes under the existing law while still protecting the rights of law-abiding citizens. On March 4, 2021, the proposed changes were passed out of legislative committee in the Georgia House of Representatives by a unanimous vote. The bill, House Bill 479, received widespread and bipartisan support. The bill to repeal the citizen's arrest law passed the legislature and was signed by Governor Kemp on May 10, 2021.

In repealing the citizen's arrest law, it was replaced with new legislation that allowed for certain private persons, such as licensed private detectives, security guards, shopkeepers, and restaurant employees, to conduct arrests under specific circumstances.

=== Ahmaud Arbery Day ===
On February 2, 2022, the Georgia General Assembly designated February 23 as Ahmaud Arbery Day within the state henceforth. The Georgia General Assembly further encouraged people to run 2.23 miles (3.59 km) on this day every year to advocate for racial justice and equity.

=== Honorary Ahmaud Arbery Street ===
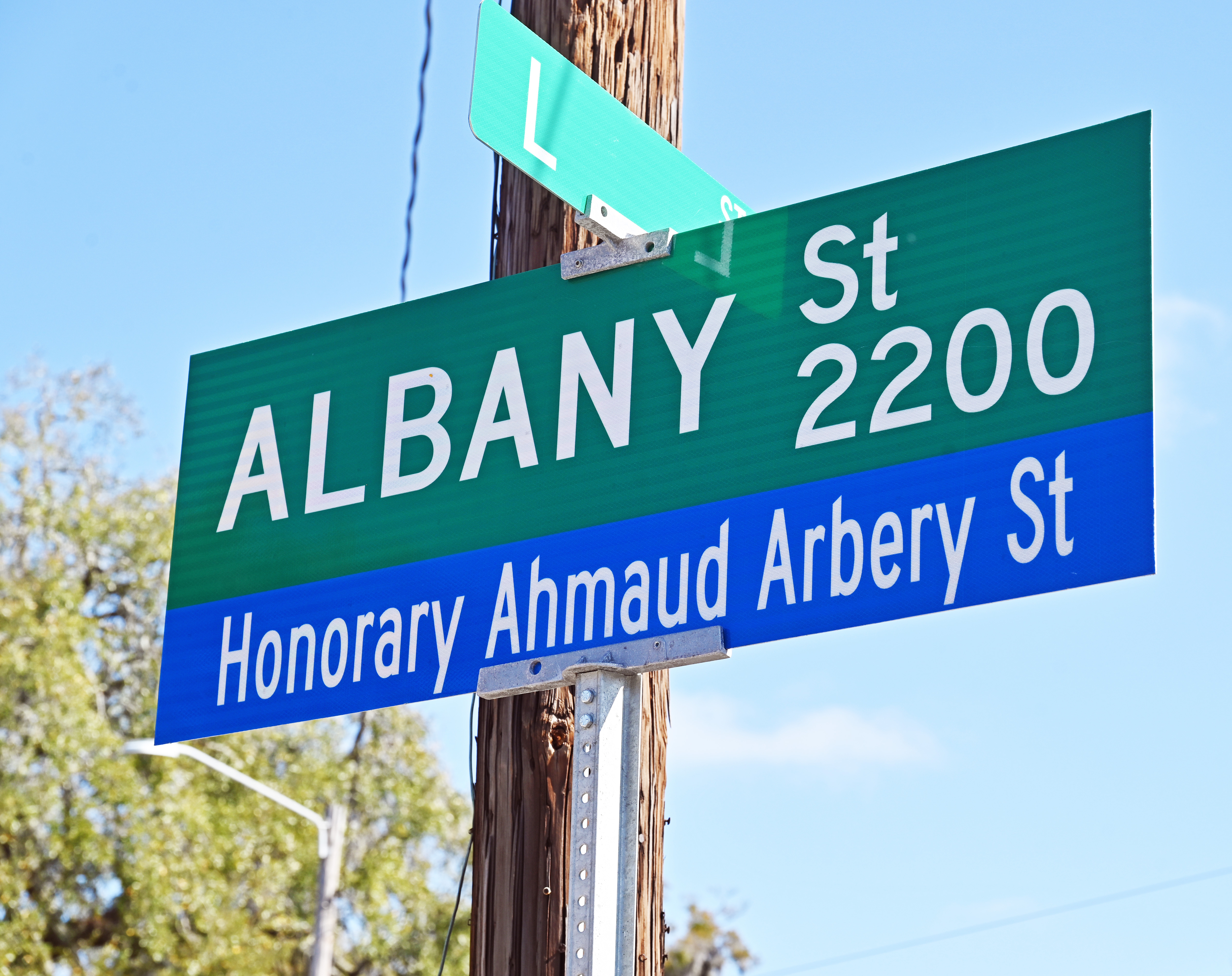
Street sign at the corner of Albany Street and L Street

On August 9, 2022, officials of the city of Brunswick designated that all intersections along a 2.7-mile (4.3 km) stretch of Albany Street bear a sign in his memory.

== Initial reactions ==
=== Involved parties and their families ===
Arbery's mother Wanda Cooper-Jones said her son was jogging when he was murdered and called for arrests to be made. The Arbery family retained Benjamin Crump, S. Lee Merritt, and Chris Stewart as attorneys. Meritt described the McMichaels as "vigilantes" and "a posse" who "performed a modern lynching in the middle of the day." Arbery's family attorney charged that videos of earlier police encounters show a pattern of unfair treatment of Arbery based on his skin color.

On May 1, Gregory McMichael told The Daily Beast he "never would have gone after someone for their color". He also said he had no direct evidence Arbery had stolen anything in the neighborhood. However, McMichael argued Arbery was on property "without permission".

A lawyer for William Bryan Jr., the man who recorded the shooting using cell phone video, said his client had done nothing wrong, had fully cooperated in the investigation, and "is not now, and never has been, a 'vigilante'." The attorney also described Bryan as "a mechanic with a high-school education" who was simply a witness to the shooting.

Attorneys for Arbery's family called for Bryan's arrest. They said that because Bryan had participated in chasing Arbery and had "corralled" him, Bryan participated in the murder.

=== Current and former elected officials ===
After the video went public, Georgia Attorney General Chris Carr said, "I expect justice to be carried out as swiftly as possible." Governor Brian Kemp said on May 7 that "Georgians deserve answers" about the incident. Two Glynn County Commissioners, Peter Murphy and Allen Booker, called for a federal probe. After viewing the video, Georgia U.S. Representative Doug Collins and U.S. Senator Kelly Loeffler said it was "disturbing" and called for a full investigation and answers.

Speaking to reporters, President Donald Trump commented, "My heart goes out to the parents and to the loved ones of the young gentleman. It's a very sad thing." Then-presumptive 2020 Democratic presidential nominee Joe Biden, said that "the video is clear: Ahmaud Arbery was killed in cold blood." Biden offered condolences and called for "a swift, full, and transparent investigation into his murder." Biden also described the shooting as a lynching.

=== Civil rights groups, commentators, and the public ===
Mural on Brunswick, Georgia's African American Cultural Center, painted in May 2020

Mural painted in July 2020

After the video was released, demonstrators gathered outside the Glynn County Courthouse to demand an arrest in the case, and called for the resignation of District Attorney Jackie Johnson. The local Brunswick NAACP chapter also called for the resignation of the Glynn County police chief. The Southern Poverty Law Center called for a federal investigation into the incident, citing their belief Arbery's murder was racially motivated.

Political commentator and former attorney David A. French wrote that, under Georgia's stand-your-ground law, because the McMichaels initiated the confrontation,

It's a crime under Georgia law to point a gun (loaded or unloaded) without legal justification. When Arbery was confronted by armed men who moved directly to block him from leaving, demanding to "talk" then Arbery was entitled to defend himself. Georgia's 'stand your ground law' arguably benefits Arbery, not those who were attempting to falsely imprison him at gunpoint.

On May 8, 2020, which would have been Arbery's 26th birthday, thousands of supporters of Arbery's family took part in a run of 2.23 miles (3.59 km), the date of his murder; they documented it to social media with the hashtag #IRunWithMaud.

Many clergy and celebrities have voiced support for review of the case, and concern about the violence. Russell D. Moore, head of the Southern Baptist Convention's Ethics and Religious Liberty Commission, said, "under any Christian vision of justice, there is no situation in which the mob murder of a person can be morally right, nor grounds for a person to be chased down and shot by private citizens." LeBron James expressed outrage on Twitter, and offered "prayers and blessings". Some posted tributes to Arbery, including Lecrae, David A. French, Scott Sauls, Christine Caine, Jack Graham, J. D. Greear, Viola Davis, Wanda Sykes, Padma Lakshmi, Gabrielle Union, and Andy Lassner.

On social media, far-right and neo-Nazi groups spread falsehoods about Arbery; their white-nationalist supporters attacked President Trump for his sympathetic comments regarding Arbery. According to an analyst from the Middle East Media Research Institute, such groups claimed Arbery was wielding a hammer and wearing Timberland boots when he was shot dead; Arbery was wearing running shoes and did not have a hammer. They also spread racist remarks about Arbery, and claimed that the McMichaels and Bryan were victims. Several far-right groups said the McMichaels' and Bryan's arrests reflected a bias against whites. Some far-right members appropriated "jogger" as a euphemism for "nigger" to both mock the circumstances of Arbery's murder, and as a way to circumvent anti-hate speech policies.

== Reactions to the verdict ==
Civil rights leaders and politicians reacted overwhelmingly to the verdict with hopeful yet cautionary statements, and Arbery's family thanked those who showed support.

=== Civil rights leaders ===
Arbery family lawyer and civil rights attorney Benjamin Crump said, "Today certainly indicates progress, but we are nowhere close to the finish line. Keep marching. Keep fighting for what is right. And never stop running for Ahmaud." Crump added, "While today is not one for celebration, it is one for reflection." Derrick Johnson, President and CEO of the NAACP, called the verdict "long overdue."

=== Family ===
Arbery's mother Wanda Cooper-Jones has said, "It's been a long fight, it's been a hard fight...Thank you to those who marched, the ones who prayed, thank you." Arbery's father Marcus Arbery commented, "We conquered that lynch mob."

=== Current and former elected officials ===
Georgia Governor Brian Kemp condemned the actions of the murderers, saying Arbery "was the victim of a vigilantism that has no place in Georgia." Kemp and Georgia Attorney General Chris Carr each called for community, state, and national "healing and reconciliation." Activist and former Minority Leader of the Georgia House of Representatives Stacey Abrams said, "A jury believed the evidence of their eyes and saw the meanness in the killers' hearts. May this verdict bring a small measure of peace." U.S. Senator Raphael Warnock from Georgia said the verdict "upholds a sense of accountability, but not true justice." Warnock's colleague Georgia Senator Jon Ossoff said, "A historic civil rights mobilization was necessary for the killers to face prosecution at all...[demonstrating] profoundly the urgency of reforms to make equal justice real in America." President Joe Biden said Arbery's murder was "a devastating reminder of how far we have to go in the fight for racial justice in this country." Vice President Kamala Harris said, "We honor (Arbery) best by continuing the fight for justice." Congressional Black Caucus chair Joyce Beatty said, "This story – although devastating – is not new; we've seen this play out repeatedly...Justice has been served. However, there is still much work to be done."

== See also ==
- Running while Black
- Lynchings in the United States
