= Incarceration in the United States =

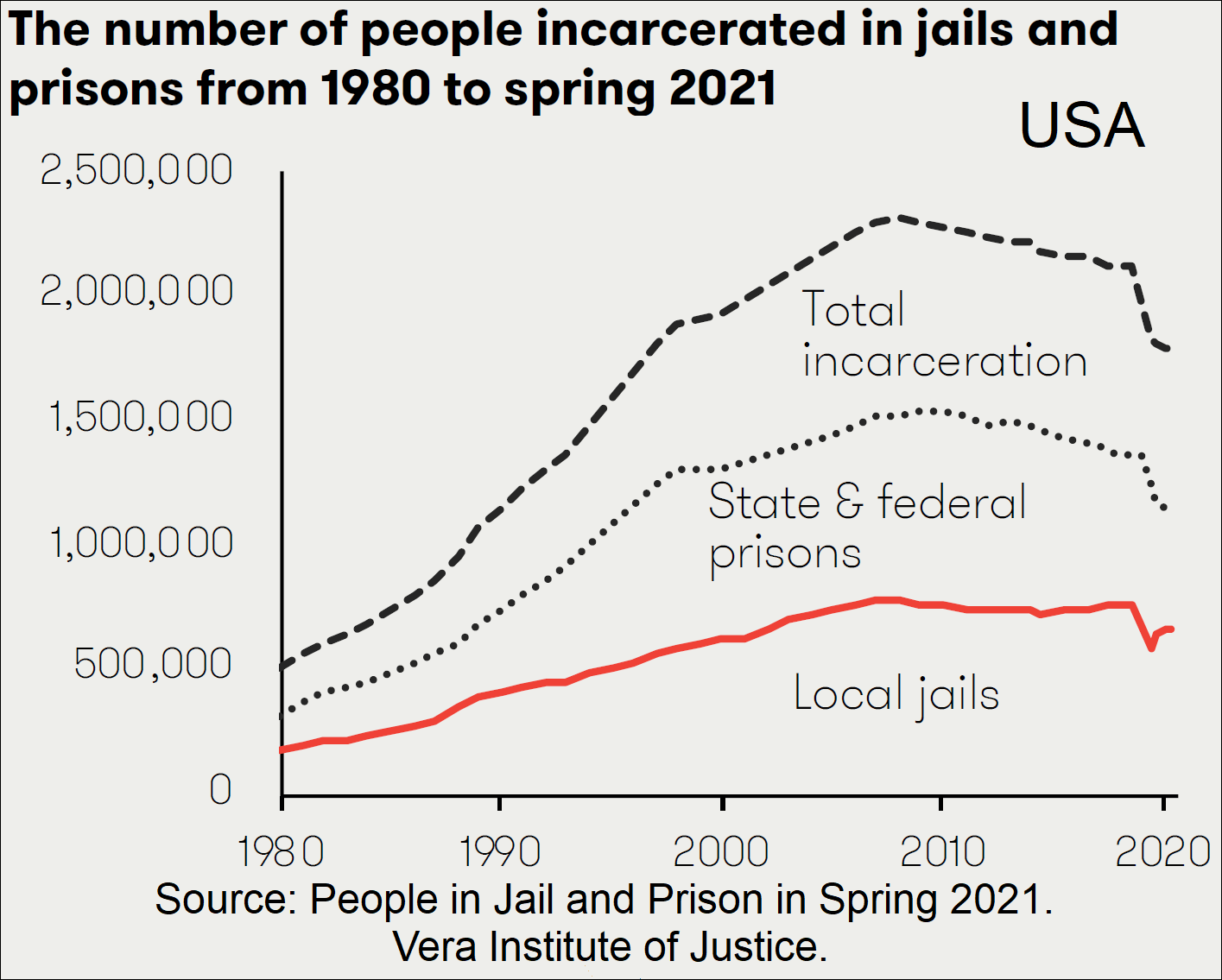
U.S. timeline graphs of number of people incarcerated in jails and prisons

Incarceration in the United States is one of the primary means of punishment for crime in the United States. In 2021, over five million people were under supervision by the criminal justice system,. At year-end 2023, 1,254,200 people were under the jurisdiction of state or federal correctional authorities, an increase of 24,100, or 2 percent, from 2022. Separately, local jails held 657,500 people in custody at midyear 2024, similar to 664,200 at midyear 2023; the 2024 figure is preliminary. The United States has the largest known prison population in the world. The country comprises 5% of the world's population while having 20% of the world's incarcerated persons. For comparison, China, with more than four times as many inhabitants, has fewer people in prison. Prison populations grew dramatically beginning in the 1970s, but began a decline around 2009, dropping 25% by year-end 2021.

Drug offenses account for the incarceration of about 1 in 5 people in U.S. prisons. Violent offenses account for over 3 in 5 people (62%) in state prisons. Property offenses account for the incarceration of about 1 in 7 people (14%) in state prisons.

The United States maintains a higher incarceration rate than most developed countries. According to the World Prison Brief on May 7, 2023, the United States has the sixth highest incarceration rate in the world, at 531 people per 100,000. Expenses related to prison, parole, and probation operations are estimated at around $81 billion annually. Court costs, bail bond fees, and prison phone fees amounted to another $38 billion annually.

Since reaching its peak level of imprisonment in 2009, the U.S. has averaged a rate of decarceration of 2.3% per year. This figure includes the anomalous 14.1% drop in 2020 in response to the COVID-19 pandemic. There is significant variation among state prison population declines. Connecticut, New Jersey, and New York have reduced their prison populations by over 50% since peaking. Twenty-five states have reduced their prison populations by 25% since reaching their peaks. The federal prison population downsized 27% relative to its peak in 2011. There was a 2% decrease in the number of persons sentenced to more than 1 year under the jurisdiction of the Federal Bureau of Prisons from 2022 to 2023.

Although debtor's prisons no longer exist in the United States, residents of some U.S. states can still be incarcerated for unpaid court fines and assessments as of 2016. The Vera Institute of Justice reported in 2015 that the majority of those incarcerated in local and county jails are there for minor violations and have been jailed for longer periods of time over the past 30 years because they are unable to pay court-imposed costs. People in some states may face extra penalties or longer supervision if they are unable to pay court-related fines and fees.

== History ==
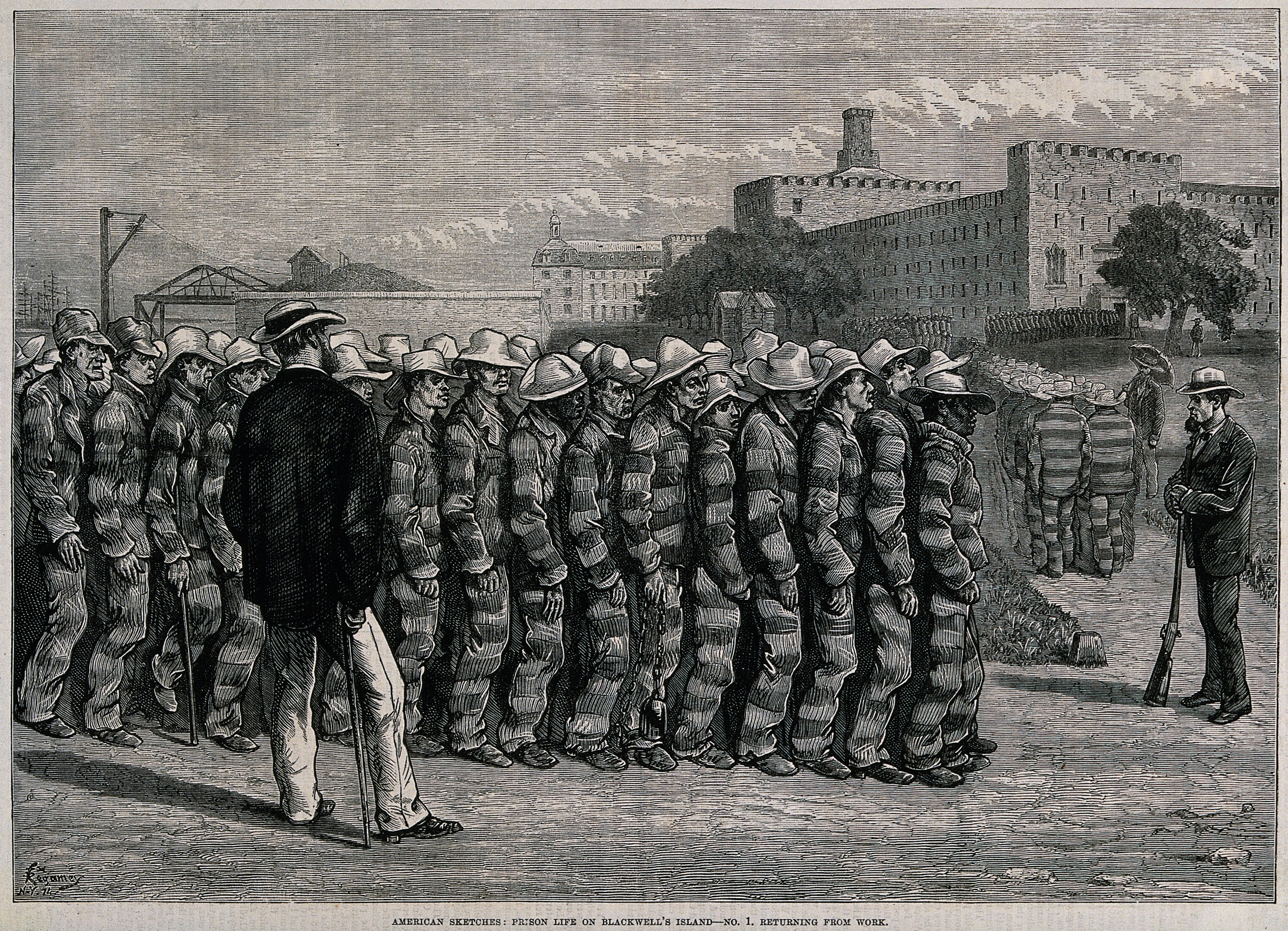
Lines of men in prisoner's uniforms marching towards a building

In the 18th century, English philanthropists began to focus on reforming convicted criminals in prison, whom they believed needed a chance to become morally pure to stop or slow crime. Since at least 1740, some of these philosophers have thought of solitary confinement as a way to create and maintain spiritually clean people in prisons. As English people immigrated to North America, so did these penological theories.

Spanish colonizers in Florida also brought their own ideas of confinement, and Spanish soldiers in St. Augustine, Florida, built the first substantial prison in North America in 1570.

Some of the first structures built in English-settled America were jails, and by the 18th century, every English-speaking North American county had a jail. These jails served a variety of functions, such as a holding place for debtors, prisoners-of-war, and political prisoners, those bound in the penal transportation and slavery systems, and those accused but not tried for crimes. Sentences for those convicted of crimes were rarely longer than three months and often lasted only a day. Poor citizens were often imprisoned longer than their wealthier neighbors, as bail was rarely granted.

Total incarceration in the United States by year (1920–2014)

One of the first prisons in America was founded in 1790 by the Pennsylvania Quakers to create a system they viewed as less cruel than dungeon prisons. They created a space where imprisoned people could read scriptures and repent as a means of self-improvement. This was known among prison reformers as the Pennsylvania System, which focused on reform, rehabilitation of the prisoner, and saving prisoners' souls through religious instruction.

In 1841, Dorothea Dix claimed that prison conditions in the U.S. were, in her opinion, inhumane. Imprisoned people were chained naked and whipped with rods. Others, who were criminally insane, were caged or placed in cellars or closets. She insisted on changes throughout the rest of her life. While focusing on the insane, her comments also resulted in changes for other inmates. Late in the 1800s, Superintendent Zebulon Brockway also changed the landscape of prison life by introducing institutionalized learning programs to inmates for rehabilitation purposes at the Elmira Reformatory in New York. As Monroe County Penitentiary Superintendent, Brockway implemented a points-based behavior system that identified low risk offenders and allowed them to participate in education programs which was later included industrial/trade schools, moral education, and academia.

Following the Civil War and during the Progressive Era of America, new concepts of the prison system, such as parole, indeterminate sentencing, and probation, were introduced. These concepts were encoded into legislative statutes in efforts to maintain the systems of racial capitalism that were formerly supported by unpaid slave labor. These legal frameworks became mainstream practices resulting in mass incarceration and legal discrimination of African Americans and other marginalized groups in America. At this time, there was an increase in crime, causing officials to handle crime in a more retributive way. Many Sicilian Americans were harshly affected by this. However, as the crime rate declined, the prison system started to focus more on rehabilitation.

US incarceration count, and rate per 100,000 population. Jails, state prisons, federal prisons.
Year	Count	Rate
1940	264,834	201
1950	264,620	176
1960	346,015	193
1970	328,020	161
1980	503,586	220
1985	744,208	311
1990	1,148,702	457
1995	1,585,586	592
2000	1,937,482	683
2002	2,033,022	703
2004	2,135,335	725
2006	2,258,792	752
2008	2,307,504	755
2010	2,270,142	731
2012	2,228,424	707
2014	2,217,947	693
2016	2,157,800	666
2018	2,102,400	642
2020	1,675,400	505
2021	1,767,200	531

On June 18, 1971, President Richard Nixon declared drug abuse "public enemy number one" in a message to Congress. His message also called for federal resources to be used for the "prevention of new addicts and the rehabilitation of those who are addicted." Following this, the media began using the term "war on drugs". According to author Emily Dufton, Nixon "transformed the public image of the drug user into one of a dangerous and anarchic threat to American civilization."

The presidency of Ronald Reagan saw the expansion of federal efforts to prevent drug abuse and prosecute offenders. Reagan signed the Comprehensive Crime Control Act of 1984, which established mandatory minimum sentences and expanded penalties for marijuana possession. He also signed the Anti-Drug Abuse Act of 1986. Support for Reagan's crime legislation was bipartisan. The 1980s saw a dramatic rise in the prison population, especially among non-violent offenders and people convicted of drug offenses.

Researcher Valerie Jenness writes, "Since the 1970s, the final wave of expansion of the prison system, there has been a huge expansion of prisons that exist at the federal and state level. Now, prisons are starting to become a private industry as more and more prisons are starting to become privatized rather than being under government control."

After the beginning of the "war on terror", the U.S. began to hold prisoners in secret CIA prisons (known as black sites) in foreign countries in order to avoid the restrictions of the Constitution. President George W. Bush acknowledged the existence of these secret prisons in a speech on September 6, 2006.

== Incarcerated population ==
As of 2023, 59% of incarcerated people are in state prisons; 12% are in federal prisons; and 29% are in local jails. Of the total state and federal prison population, 8% or 96,370 people are incarcerated in private prisons. An additional 2.9 million people are on probation, and over 800,000 people are on parole. At year-end 2021, 1,000,000 people were incarcerated in state prisons; 157,000 people were incarcerated in federal prisons; and 636,000 people were incarcerated in local jails.

Approximately 1.8 million people are incarcerated in state or federal prisons or local jails. There are over 1 million people who are incarcerated in state prisons. There are 684,000 people incarcerated for violent offenses, 138,000 for property offenses, 139,000 for drug offenses, and 130,000 for public order offenses. The percentage breakdown of people in state prisons by offense type is as follows: 62% of people are incarcerated for violent offenses, 13% for property offenses, 13% for drug offenses, and 12% for public order offenses.

The federal prison population is approximately 152,299. 136,636 of these people are incarcerated by the Federal Bureau of Prisons. Of these people, there are 69,000 people incarcerated for drug offenses, 61,000 for public order offenses, 11,000 for violent offenses, and 6,000 for property offenses. The percentage breakdown of people incarcerated by offense-type is as follows: 47% of people are incarcerated for drug offenses, 42% for public order offenses, 7% for violent offenses, and 4% for property offenses. The U.S. Marshals Service incarcerates a further 60,000 people. Of these people, there are 21,000 incarcerated for drug offenses, 14,000 for immigration offenses, 9,000 for weapons offenses, and 7,000 for violent offenses.

Finally, 619,000 people are incarcerated in local jails. Jail incarceration accounts for a third of all incarcerations. Over 80% of people incarcerated in local jails have not yet been convicted.

The First Step Act was adopted in 2018 in an effort to shrink the incarcerated population in the Federal Bureau of Prisons system. In 2025, BOP Director William Marshall announced a renewed emphasis on the execution of those promises, including shrinking the population of non-violent offenders in the federal system.

== Demographics ==
=== Race and ethnicity ===
2021. People incarcerated in state or federal prisons by race and ethnicity.
Race, ethnicity	% of US population	% of incarcerated population	Incarceration rate (per 100,000)
White (non-Hispanic)	59	31	181
Hispanic	19	24	434
Black	14	32	901

Studies have found that differences at multiple stages of the criminal justice process, including pretrial detention, sentencing decisions, and sentence length, can compound over time and contribute to disparities in incarceration rates among racial and ethnic groups.

"Blacks are more likely than Whites to be confined awaiting trial (which increases the probability that an incarcerative sentence will be imposed), to receive incarcerative rather than community sentences, and to receive longer sentences. Racial differences found at each stage are typically modest, but their cumulative effect is significant."

Broader socioeconomic inequality and disparities at each stage of the criminal legal process result in the disproportionate imprisonment of people of color. In 2021, people of color constituted over two-thirds (69%) of the prison population. Nationally, one in 81 African American adults is serving time in America's state prisons. Black Americans are imprisoned at 5 times the rate of White people, and American Indians and Hispanic people are imprisoned at 4 times and 2 times the white rate, respectively. Black and Hispanic people make up 33% of the U.S. population but 56% of the incarcerated population.

Although significant gaps remain, there have been reductions in imprisonment disparities over the past decades. The extent of decarceration has varied by race and ethnicity, but all major racial and ethnic groups experienced decarceration since reaching their highest levels. The Black prison population has decreased the most. Since 2002, the year it reached its peak levels, the number of Black people in prison declined from 622,700 to 378,000 (a 39% decrease). Since 1998, the year the white prison population reached its peak, the number of white people in prison declined from 533,200 to 356,000 (a 25% decrease). Since 2011, the year the Hispanic prison population reached its peak, the number of Hispanic people in prison declined from 347,300 to 273,800 (a 21% decrease). Since 2010, the year the American Indian prison population reached its peak, the number of American Indians in prison declined from 23,800 to 18,700 (a 21% decrease). Finally, since 2016, the year the Asian prison population reached its peak, the number of Asian people in prison declined from 18,000 to 14,700. According to the Prison Policy Initiative, 41% of inmates were Black, 36% were White, and 20% were Latino in 2023.

=== Gender ===
2010 adult incarceration rates by race, ethnicity, and sex per 100,000 adult US residents
Race or ethnicity	Male	Female
White	678	91
Black	4,347	260
Hispanic	1,775	133

In 2013, there were 102,400 adult women in local jails in the United States and 111,300 in state and federal prisons. Within the U.S., the rate of female incarceration increased fivefold in a two-decade span ending in 2001; the increase occurred because of increased prosecutions and convictions of offenses related to recreational drugs, increases in the severities of offenses, and a lack of community sanctions and treatment for women who violate laws. In the United States, authorities began housing women in correctional facilities separate from men in the 1870s. According to the ACLU, "More than half of the women in prisons and jails (56%) are incarcerated for drug or property offenses, and Black women are two times as likely to be incarcerated as white women." Black women tend to receive longer sentences and harsher punishments than white women for committing the same crimes. According to Angela Davis (2003), in many situations, white women are put in mental institutions, whereas black women are sent to prison for the same crime.

However, since the early 2000s, the incarceration rates for African American and Hispanic American women have declined, while incarceration rates have increased for white women. Between 2000 and 2017, the incarceration rate for white women increased by 44%, while at the same time declining by 55% for African American women. The Sentencing Project reports that by 2021, incarceration rates had declined by 70% for African American women, while rising by 7% for white women. In 2017, The Washington Post reported that white women's incarceration rate was growing faster than ever before, as the rate for black women declined. The incarceration rate of African American males is also falling sharply, even faster that white men's incarceration rate, contrary to the popular opinion that black males are increasingly incarcerated.

In 2011, it was reported that 85 to 90% of women incarcerated were victims of sexual and domestic violence, which is significantly higher than the national average of 22.3% of women in the United States. Women who face sexual or domestic violence are more likely to commit crimes themselves and become incarcerated. The history of black women experiencing higher rates of abuse than white women provides one of many explanations for why African American women have faced higher rates of incarceration than white women.

In 2013, there were 628,900 adult males in local jails in the United States, and 1,463,500 adult males in state and federal prisons. In a study of sentencing in the United States in 1984, David B. Mustard found that males received 12 percent longer prison terms than females after "controlling for the offense level, criminal history, district, and offense type," and noted that "females receive even shorter sentences relative to men than whites relative to blacks." A later study by Sonja B. Starr found sentences for men to be up to 60% higher when controlling for more variables. Several explanations for this disparity have been offered, including that women have more to lose from incarceration, and that men are the targets of discrimination in sentencing.

=== Youth ===
Juveniles in residential placement, 1997–2015. US
Year	Male	Female	Total
1997	90,771	14,284	105,055
1999	92,985	14,508	107,493
2001	89,115	15,104	104,219
2003	81,975	14,556	96,531
2006	78,998	13,723	92,721
2007	75,017	11,797	86,814
2010	61,359	9,434	70,793
2011	53,079	8,344	61,423
2013	46,421	7,727	54,148
2015	40,750	7,293	48,043

Through the juvenile courts and the adult criminal justice system, the United States incarcerates more of its youth than any other country in the world, a reflection of the larger trends in incarceration practices in the United States. This has been a source of controversy for many reasons, including the overcrowding and violence in youth detention facilities, the prosecution of youths as adults, and the long-term consequences of incarceration on the individual's chances for success in adulthood. In 2014, the United Nations Human Rights Committee criticized the United States for about ten judicial abuses, including the mistreatment of juvenile inmates. A UN report published in 2015 criticized the U.S. for being the only nation in the world to sentence juveniles to life imprisonment without parole.

According to federal data from 2011, around 40% of the nation's juvenile inmates are housed in private facilities.

The incarceration of youths has been linked to the effects of family and neighborhood influences. One study found that the "behaviors of family members and neighborhood peers appear to substantially affect the behavior and outcomes of disadvantaged youths".

Nearly 53,000 youth were incarcerated in 2015. 4,656 of those were held in adult facilities, while the rest were in juvenile facilities. Of those in juvenile facilities, 69% are 16 or older, while over 500 are 12 or younger. As arrest and crime rates are not equal across demographic groups, neither is prison population. The Prison Policy Initiative broke down those numbers, finding that, relative to their share of the U.S. population, "black and American Indian youth are over represented in juvenile facilities while white youth are under represented". Black youth comprise 14% of the national youth population, but "43% of boys and 34% of girls in juvenile facilities are Black. And even excluding youth held in Indian country facilities, American Indians make up 3% of girls and 1.5% of boys in juvenile facilities, despite comprising less than 1% of all youth nationally.".

=== Students ===
The term "school-to-prison pipeline", also known as the "schoolhouse-to-jailhouse track", is a concept that was named in the 1980s. The school-to-prison pipeline is the idea that a school's harsh punishments—which typically push students out of the classroom—lead to the criminalization of students' misbehaviors and result in increasing a student's probability of entering the prison system. Although the school-to-prison pipeline is aggravated by a combination of ingredients, zero-tolerance policies are viewed as main contributors. Additionally, the "School to Prison Pipeline disproportionately impacts the poor, students with disabilities, and youth of color, especially African Americans, who are suspended and expelled at the highest rates, despite comparable rates of infraction."

In 1994, the Gun-Free Schools Act was passed. It required that students receive at least a one-year suspension if they brought a weapon to school. Many states then adopted the Zero-tolerance policy, which led to an increase in suspensions, mainly for Black and Hispanic children.

At the same time these policies were growing, school districts adopted their own version of the "broken windows theory". The broken windows theory emphasizes the importance of 'cracking down' on minor offenses to make residents feel safer and discourage more serious crime. For schools, this meant more suspensions for minor offenses such as talking back to teachers, skipping class, or being disobedient or disruptive. This led to police officers being stationed in schools, which in turn resulted in students being arrested and treated more harshly.

Zero-tolerance policies are regulations that mandate specific consequences for specified student misbehavior, typically without regard to the unique circumstances of a given incident. Zero-tolerance policies both implicitly and explicitly usher the student into the prison track. Implicitly, when a student is extracted from the classroom, the more likely that student is to drop out of school as a result of being in class less. As a dropout, that child is then ill-prepared to obtain a job and become a fruitful citizen. Explicitly, schools sometimes do not funnel their pupils to the prison systems inadvertently; rather, they send them directly. Once in juvenile court, even sympathetic judges are not likely to evaluate whether the school's punishment was warranted or fair. For these reasons, it is argued that zero-tolerance policies lead to an exponential increase in the juvenile prison populations.

The national suspension rate doubled from 3.7% to 7.4% from 1973 to 2010. The claim that Zero Tolerance Policies affect students of color at a disproportionate rate is supported in the Code of Maryland Regulations study, which found black students were suspended at more than double the rate of white students. This data is further backed by Moriah Balingit, who states that when compared to white students, black students are suspended and expelled at greater rates according to the Civil Rights Data Collection, that has records with specific information for the 2015–2016 school year of about 96,000 schools. In addition, further data shows that although black students only accounted for 15% of the student population, they represented a 31% of the arrests. Hispanic children share this in common with their black counterparts, as they too are more susceptible to harsher discipline like suspension and expulsion. This trend can be seen throughout numerous studies of this type of material and particularly in the south. Furthermore, between 1985 and 1989, there was an increase in referrals of minority youth to juvenile court, petitioned cases, adjudicated delinquency cases, and delinquency cases placed outside the home. During this time period, the number of African American youth detained increased by 9% and the number of Hispanic youths detained increased by 4%; yet, the proportion of White youth declined by 13%. Documentation of this phenomenon can be seen as early as 1975 with the book School Suspensions: Are they helping children? Additionally, as punitive action leads to dropout rates, so does imprisonment. Data shows that in the year 2000, one in three black male students ages 20–40 who did not complete high school were incarcerated. Moreover, about 70% of those in state prison have not finished high school. Lastly, if one is a black male living post-Civil Rights Movement with no high school diploma, there is a 60% chance that they will be incarcerated in their lifetime.

=== Elderly ===
The percentage of prisoners in federal and state prisons aged 55 and older increased by 33% from 2000 to 2005, while the prison population grew by 8%. The Southern Legislative Conference found that in 16 southern states, the elderly prisoner population increased on average by 145% between 1997 and 2007. The growth of the elderly population led to higher health care costs, most notably reflected in the 10% average increase in state prison budgets from 2005 to 2006.

The SLC expects the percentage of elderly prisoners relative to the overall prison population to continue to rise. Ronald Aday, a professor of aging studies at Middle Tennessee State University and author of Aging Prisoners: Crisis in American Corrections, concurs. One out of six prisoners in California is serving a life sentence. Aday predicts that by 2020, 16% percent of those serving life sentences will be elderly.

State governments pay all of their inmates' housing costs, which significantly increase as prisoners age. Inmates are unable to apply for Medicare and Medicaid. Most Departments of Corrections report spending more than 10 percent of the annual budget on elderly care.

The American Civil Liberties Union published a report in 2012 which asserts that the elderly prison population has climbed 1300% since the 1980s, with 125,000 inmates aged 55 or older now incarcerated.

=== LGBT people ===
LGBT (lesbian, gay, bisexual, or transgender) youth are disproportionately more likely than the general population to come into contact with the criminal justice system. According to the National Center for Transgender Equality, 16% of transgender adults have been in prison and/or jail, compared to 2.7% of all adults. It has also been found that 13–15% of youth in detention identify as LGBT, whereas an estimated 4–8 percent of the general youth population identify as such.

According to Yarbrough (2021), higher rates of poverty, homelessness, and profiling of transgender people by law enforcement are the cause of the higher rate of imprisonment experienced by transgender and gender non-conforming people. LGBT youth not only experience these same challenges, but many also live in homes unwelcoming to their identities. This often results in LGBT youth running away and/or engaging in criminal activities, such as the drug trade, sex work, and/or theft, which places them at higher risk for arrest. Because of discriminatory practices and limited access to resources, transgender adults are also more likely to engage in criminal activities to be able to pay for housing, health care, and other basic needs.

LGBT people in jail and prison are particularly vulnerable to mistreatment by other inmates and staff. This mistreatment includes solitary confinement (which may be described as "protective custody"), physical and sexual violence, verbal abuse, and denial of medical care and other services. According to the National Inmate Survey, in 2011–12, 40 percent of transgender inmates reported sexual victimization compared to 4 percent of all inmates.

=== Mentally disabled ===
In the United States, the percentage of inmates with mental illness has been steadily increasing, with rates more than quadrupling from 1998 to 2006. Many have attributed this trend to the deinstitutionalization of mentally ill persons beginning in the 1960s, when mental hospitals across the country began closing their doors. However, other researchers indicate that "there is no evidence for the basic criminalization premise that decreased psychiatric services explain the disproportionate risk of incarceration for individuals with mental illness".

According to the Bureau of Justice Statistics, over half of all prisoners in 2005 had experienced mental illness as identified by "a recent history or symptoms of a mental health problem"; of this population, jail inmates experienced the highest rates of symptoms of mental illness at 60 percent, followed by 49 percent of state prisoners and 40 percent of federal prisoners. Not only do people with recent histories of mental illness end up incarcerated, but many who have no history of mental illness end up developing symptoms while in prison. In 2006, the Bureau of Justice Statistics found that a quarter of state prisoners had a history of mental illness, whereas 3 in 10 state prisoners had developed symptoms of mental illness since becoming incarcerated, with no recent history of mental illness.

According to Human Rights Watch, one of the contributing factors to the disproportionate rates of mental illness in prisons and jails is the increased use of solitary confinement, for which "socially and psychologically meaningful contact is reduced to the absolute minimum, to a point that is insufficient for most detainees to remain mentally well functioning". Another factor to be considered is that most inmates do not get the mental health services that they need while incarcerated. Due to limited funding, prisons are not able to provide a full range of mental health services and thus are typically limited to inconsistent administration of psychotropic medication, or no psychiatric services at all. Human Rights Watch also claims that corrections officers routinely use excessive violence against mentally ill inmates for nonthreatening behaviors related to schizophrenia or bipolar disorder. These reports found that some inmates had been shocked, shackled, and pepper-sprayed.

Mental illness rarely stands alone when analyzing the risk factors associated with incarceration and recidivism rates. The American Psychological Association recommends a holistic approach to reducing recidivism rates among offenders by providing "cognitive–behavioral treatment focused on criminal cognition" or "services that target variable risk factors for high-risk offenders" due to the numerous intersecting risk factors experienced by mentally ill and non-mentally ill offenders alike.

To prevent the recidivism of individuals with mental illness, a variety of programs are in place that are based on criminal justice or mental health intervention models. Programs modeled after criminal justice strategies include diversion programs, mental health courts, specialty mental health probation or parole, and jail aftercare/prison re-entry. Programs modeled after mental health interventions include forensic assertive community treatment and forensic intensive case management. It has been argued that the wide diversity of these program interventions points to a lack of clarity on which specific program components are most effective in reducing recidivism rates among individuals with mental illness. Inmates who have a mental illness tend to stay longer in jail compared to inmates who don't. Inmates with mental illness may struggle to understand and follow prison rules. Inmates with mental illness will usually get in trouble with more facility violation rules. Suicide is the leading cause of death in many prisons. People who have a serious mental illness tend to die by suicide more often in prison.

=== Immigrants and foreign nationals ===
The United States government holds tens of thousands of immigrants in detention under the control of Customs and Border Protection (CBP) and Immigration and Customs Enforcement (ICE). These immigrants seek asylum in the United States and are detained before release into the United States or deportation and removal from the country. During 2018, 396,448 people were booked into ICE custody: 242,778 of whom were detained by CBP and 153,670 by ICE's own enforcement operations.

The BOP receives all prisoner transfer treaty inmates sent from foreign countries, even if their crimes, if committed in the United States, would have been tried in state, DC, or territorial courts. Non-US citizens incarcerated in federal and state prisons are eligible to be transferred to their home countries if they qualify.

=== Class and poverty ===
The poor in the United States are incarcerated at a much higher rate than their counterparts in other developed nations. According to a 2015 study by the Vera Institute of Justice, jails in the U.S. have become "massive warehouses" of the impoverished since the 1980s.

A December 2017 report by Philip Alston, the U.N. Special Rapporteur on extreme poverty and human rights, asserted that the justice system throughout the U.S. is designed to keep people mired in poverty and to generate revenue to fund the justice system and other governmental programs.

Sociologist Matthew Desmond of Princeton University writes that the "overwhelming majority" of prisoners and former prisoners of the U.S. prison system, which "has no equal in any other country or any other epoch," are extremely poor. And they stay poor, as prison jobs pay an average wage of between 14 cents and $1.41 an hour. He notes that the carceral state also "disappears" the incarcerated poor by erasing them from poverty statistics and national surveys, "which means there are millions more poor Americans than official statistics let on."

Political scientist Marie Gottschalk of the University of Pennsylvania writes that during the neoliberal era while the prison population was rapidly increasing as the U.S. was targeting mostly poor and working class people by harshly punishing street crimes, drug crimes and immigration offenses, there was a simultaneous mass deregulation and decriminalization of white collar and corporate crime which saw a dramatic escalation.

== Features of the criminal justice system ==
=== Duration ===
Many legislatures have continually reduced judges' discretion in both the sentencing process and the determination of when the conditions of a sentence have been satisfied. Determinate sentencing, use of mandatory minimums, and guidelines-based sentencing continue to remove the human element from sentencing, such as the prerogative of the judge to consider the mitigating or extenuating circumstances of a crime to determine the appropriate length of the incarceration. As a consequence of "three strikes laws", the increase in the duration of incarceration in the last decade was most pronounced in the case of life prison sentences, which increased by 83% between 1992 and 2003, while violent crimes fell in the same period.

=== Violent and nonviolent crime ===
In 2016, there were an estimated 1.2 million violent crimes committed in the United States. Over the course of that year, U.S. law enforcement agencies made approximately 10.7 million arrests, excluding arrests for traffic violations. In that year, approximately 2.3 million people were incarcerated in jail or prison.

Felony Sentences in State Courts, study by the United States Department of Justice

As of September 30, 2009, in federal prisons, 7.9% of sentenced people were incarcerated for violent crimes, while at year end 2008 of sentenced people in state prisons, 52.4% had been jailed for violent crimes. In 2002 (latest available data by type of offense), 21.6% of convicted inmates in jails were in prison for violent crimes. Among unconvicted inmates in jails in 2002, 34% had a violent offense as the most serious charge. 41% percent of convicted and unconvicted jail inmates in 2002 had a current or prior violent offense; 46% were nonviolent recidivists.

From 2000 to 2008, the state prison population increased by 159,200 imprisoned people, and violent offenders accounted for 60% of this increase. The number of drug offenders in state prisons declined by 12,400 over this period. Furthermore, while the number of violent offenders sentenced to state prison increased from 2000 through 2008, the expected length of stay for these offenders declined slightly during this period.

In 2013, The Week reported that at least 3,278 Americans were serving life sentences without parole for nonviolent crimes, including "cursing at a policeman and selling $10 worth of drugs. More than 80 percent of these life sentences are the result of mandatory sentencing laws."

In 2016, about 200,000, under 16%, of the 1.3 million people in state jails, were serving time for drug offenses. 700,000 were incarcerated for violent offenses.

Nonviolent crime was the main driver of the increase in the incarcerated population in the United States from 1980 to 2003. Violent crime rates had been relatively constant or declining over those decades. The prison population increased primarily due to public policy changes, resulting in more prison sentences and longer time served, for example, through mandatory minimum sentences, "three strikes" laws, and reductions in the availability of parole or early release.

Perhaps the single greatest force behind the growth of the prison population has been the national "war on drugs". The legislation for the "war on drugs" can be traced back to the United Nations Convention on Psychotropic Substances in 1971, which led to the regulation and classification of substances deemed to meet the criteria set by the World Health Organization. The criteria used by the World Health Organization are that the substance has the capacity to produce a state of dependence, and central nervous system stimulation or depression that results in hallucinations or disturbances in motor function, thinking, behavior, perception, or mood. If the World Health Organization finds that the substance meets these criteria, it is placed under international control. After the substances were identified, all governments with the necessary facilities should take similar action facilitating the campaign and creating a guideline for the war on drugs. Following this convention, the United States enacted the Federal Comprehensive Drug Abuse Prevention and Control Act on May 1, 1971, outlining the United Nations' findings and implementing policies aligned with the United Nations' request. The war on drugs initiative expanded during the presidency of Ronald Reagan. During Reagan's term, a bipartisan Congress established the Anti-Drug Abuse Act of 1986, galvanized by the death of Len Bias. According to the Human Rights Watch, legislation like this led to the extreme increase in drug offense imprisonment and "increasing racial disproportions among the arrestees". The number of incarcerated drug offenders has increased twelvefold since 1980. In 2000, 22 percent of those in federal and state prisons were convicted on drug charges. In 2011, 55.6% of the 1,131,210 sentenced people in state prisons were being held for violent crimes (this number excludes the 200,966 imprisoned people being held due to parole violations, of which 39.6% were re-incarcerated for a subsequent violent crime). Also in 2011, 3.7% of the state prison population consisted of imprisoned people whose highest conviction was for drug possession (again excluding those incarcerated for parole violations of which 6.0% were re-incarcerated for a subsequent act of drug possession).

=== Pre-trial detention ===
In 2020, the non-profit Prison Policy Initiative issued a report, "Mass Incarceration: The Whole Pie 2020", that said, based on the most recent census data and information from the Bureau of Prisons, an overwhelming majority of inmates in county and municipal jails were being held pre-trial, without having been convicted of a crime. The Pre-Trial Justice Institute noted, "Six out of 10 people in U.S. jails—nearly a half million individuals on any given day—are awaiting trial. People who have not been found guilty of the charges against them account for 95% of all jail population growth between 2000–2014."

In 2017, 482,100 inmates in federal and state prisons were held pre-trial.

Advocates for decarceration contend the large pre-trial detention population serves as a compelling reason for bail reform anchored in a presumption of innocence. "We don't want people sitting in jails only because they cannot afford their financial bail," said Representative John Tilley (D) of Kentucky, a state that has eliminated commercial bail and relies on a risk assessment to determine a defendant's flight risk.

In March 2020, the Department of Justice issued its report, noting the county and municipal jail population, totaling 738,400 inmates, had decreased by 12% over the last decade, from an estimated 258 jail inmates per 100,000 U.S. residents in 2008 to 226 per 100,000 in 2018. For the first time since 1990, the 2018 jail incarceration rate for African Americans fell below 600 per 100,000, while the juvenile jail population dropped 56%, from 7,700 to 3,400.

In 2018, sixty-eight percent of jail inmates were behind bars on felony charges, and about two-thirds of the total jail population was awaiting court action or held for other reasons.

=== Prison education ===
Prison education encompasses any educational program offered within a prison, including literacy programs, high school or GED- equivalent programs, vocational education, and tertiary education. In the early 1800s, tutors began to enter prisons, and the idea of punishment began to shift towards rehabilitation. By the early 1990s, there were over 350 prison education programs nationwide. In 1994, Bill Clinton signed the Violent Crime Control and Law Enforcement Act into law, which barred incarcerated people from receiving Pell Grants. This led to a decline in the number of educational programs due to a lack of federal funding.

The Civil Rights Act of 1960 prompted the collection of employment data, and the Elementary and Secondary Education Act required the collection of data for school funding. However, the true depth of inequality in education was not known despite several significant education policies being enacted because inmates were excluded from federal surveys. Studies in the 1990s by psychologists, social justice advocates, scholars, and researchers showed that inmate exclusion grossly inflates education attainment rates as the prison population grows, and the Pell Grant ban severely impacted the reintegration of formerly incarcerated people into society. This resulted in the restoral of federal Pell Grant funding for Prison Education Programs (PEP) and legislation like California bill SB416 that protects incarcerated students from predatory lending.

Prison education has been shown to lower recidivism rates and increase employment among graduates upon release. A 2013 study by the RAND Corporation found that correctional education led to a significant reduction in recidivism rates, and that participants in prison education programs had "43% lower odds of recidivating than inmates who did not." That same study showed that individuals who received vocational education and training saw a 28% increase in employment following incarceration, and those who participated in strictly academic educational programs saw an 8% increase in employment.

=== Recidivism ===
A 2002 study found that among nearly 275,000 prisoners released in 1994, 67.5% were rearrested within 3 years, and 51.8% were back in prison. However, the study found no evidence that spending more time in prison raises the recidivism rate, and found that those serving the longest time, 61 months or more, had a slightly lower re-arrest rate (54.2%) than every other category of prisoners. This is most likely explained by the older average age of those released with the longest sentences, and the study shows a strong negative correlation between recidivism and age upon release. According to the Bureau of Justice Statistics, a study tracked 404,638 prisoners in 30 states after their release from prison in 2005. From the examination, it was found that within three years after their release, 67.8% of the released prisoners were rearrested; within five years, 76.6% of the released prisoners were rearrested, and of the prisoners that were rearrested, 56.7% of them were rearrested by the end of their first year of release.

=== Comparison with other countries ===
A map of incarceration rates by country

With around 100 prisoners per 100,000, the United States had an average prison and jail population until 1980. Afterward, it drifted apart considerably. The United States has the highest prison and jail population (2,121,600 in adult facilities in 2016) as well as the highest incarceration rate in the world (655 per 100,000 population in 2016). According to the World Prison Population List (11th edition) there were around 10.35 million people in penal institutions worldwide in 2015. The U.S. had 2,173,800 prisoners in adult facilities in 2015. That means the U.S. held 21.0% of the world's prisoners in 2015, even though the U.S. represented only around 4.4 percent of the world's population in 2015.

Comparing other English-speaking developed countries, whereas the incarceration rate of the U.S. is 655 per 100,000 population of all ages, the incarceration rate of Canada is 114 per 100,000 (as of 2015), England and Wales is 146 per 100,000 (as of 2016), Australia is 160 per 100,000 (as of 2016) and Ireland is 82 per 100,000 (as of Aug 2022). Compared with other developed countries, Spain's rate is 133 per 100,000 (as of 2016). Greece is 89 per 100,000 (as of 2016), Norway is 73 per 100,000 (as of 2016), Netherlands is 69 per 100,000 (as of 2014), and Japan is 48 per 100,000 (as of 2014).

According to a 2021 report by the Prison Policy Initiative, every state has a higher incarceration rate than "virtually any independent democracy on earth." Louisiana has the highest incarceration rate at 1,094. In 2012, The Times-Picayune described the state as the prison capital of the world.

A 2008 New York Times article, said that "it is the length of sentences that truly distinguishes American prison policy. Indeed, the mere number of sentences imposed here would not place the United States at the top of the incarceration lists. If lists were compiled based on per-capita annual prison admissions, several European countries would outpace the United States. But American prison stays are much longer, so the total incarceration rate is higher."

The number of incarcerated individuals in U.S. jails and prisons jumped 500% in the three decades following the implementation of tougher sentencing laws associated with the war on drugs and the "tough on crime" movement. The U.S. incarceration rate peaked in 2008 when about 1 in 100 US adults was behind bars. This incarceration rate exceeded the average incarceration levels in the Soviet Union during the existence of the Gulag system, when the Soviet Union's population reached 168 million, and 1.2 to 1.5 million people were in the Gulag prison camps and colonies (i.e., about 0.8 imprisoned per 100 USSR residents, according to numbers from Anne Applebaum and Steven Rosefielde). In The New Yorker article The Caging of America (2012), Adam Gopnik writes: "Over all, there are now more people under 'correctional supervision' in America—more than six million—than were in the Gulag Archipelago under Stalin at its height."

== Operational ==
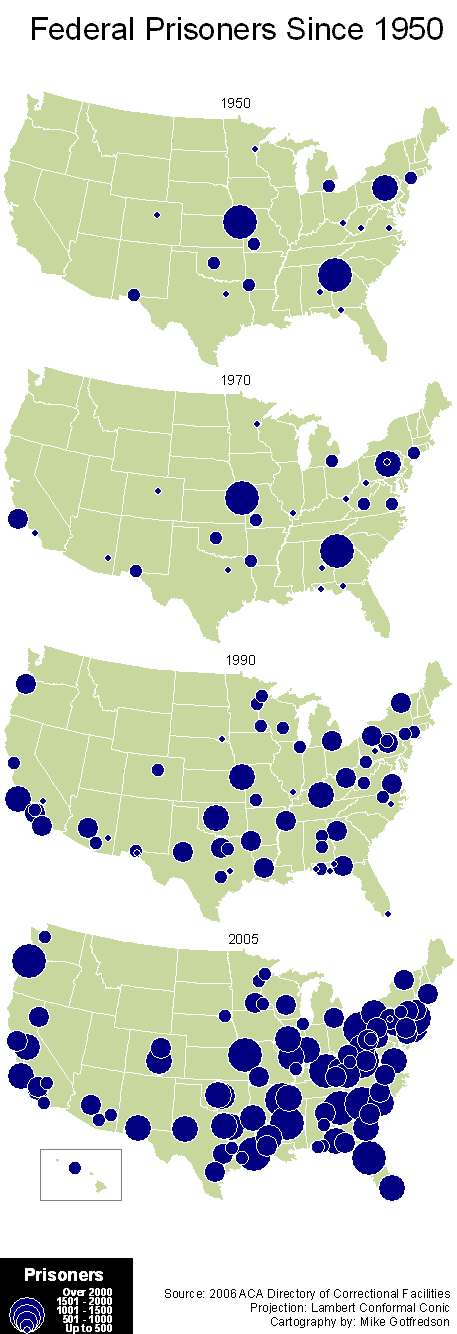
U.S. federal prisoner distribution since 1950

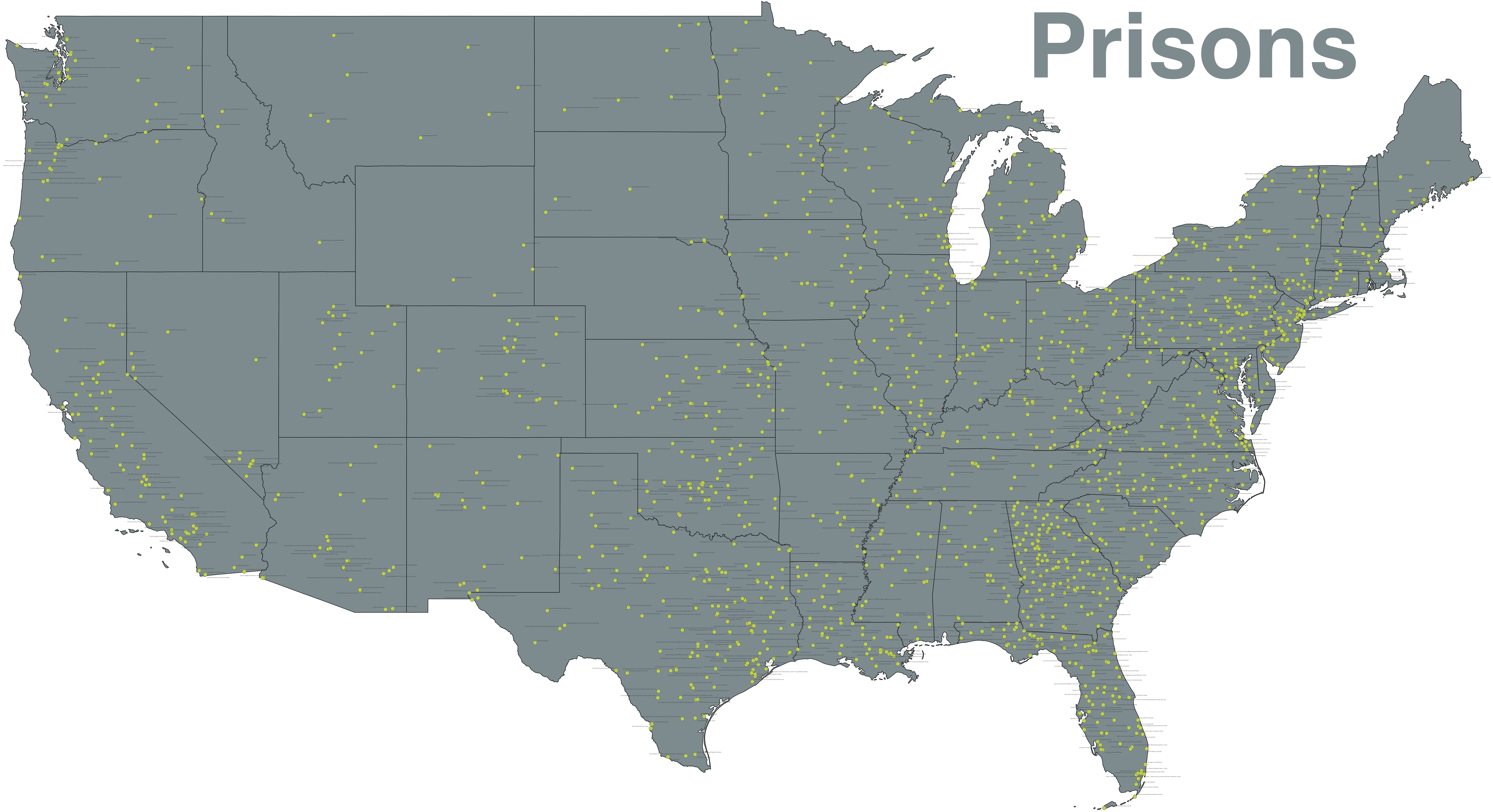
Prisons in the United States

=== Prison systems ===
The American prison system is highly heterogeneous. In fact, it would be misleading to suggest that the U.S. has one "criminal justice system." Instead, there are thousands of systems across federal, state, local, and tribal levels. In 2023, there were reported to be "1,566 state prisons, 98 federal prisons, 3,116 local jails, 1,323 juvenile correctional facilities, 181 immigrant detention facilities, and 80 Indian country jails, as well as military prisons, civil commitment centers, state psychiatric hospitals, and prisons in the U.S. territories."

Despite the country's disparate systems of confinement, the U.S. prison system is generally characterized by four main institutions: state prisons, federal prisons, local jails, and juvenile correctional facilities. State prisons are run by state departments of correction, holding sentenced people serving time for felony offenses, usually longer than a year. Federal prisons are run by the U.S. Bureau of Prisons and hold people who have been convicted of federal crimes and pretrial detainees. Local jails are county or municipal facilities that incarcerate defendants before trial, and also hold those serving short sentences, typically under a year. Juvenile correctional facilities are operated by local authorities or the state and serve as longer-term placements for youth who have been adjudicated as delinquent and ordered by a judge to be confined.

=== Security levels ===
In some, but not all, states' departments of corrections, inmates reside in different facilities that vary by security level, particularly in security measures, inmate administration, housing type, and the weapons and tactics used by corrections officers. The federal government's Bureau of Prisons uses a numbered scale from one to five to represent the security level. Level five is the most secure, while level one is the least. State prison systems operate similar systems. California, for example, classifies its facilities from Reception Center through Levels I to V (minimum to maximum security) to specialized high security units (all considered Level V), including Security Housing Unit (SHU)—California's version of supermax—and related units. Jails operated by county and local governments are typically smaller than prisons and less able to manage security issues raised by overcrowding. Due to the variety of prisoners incarcerated in jails, from defendants awaiting trial, to people serving short sentences for minor crimes, to people with significant histories of escape attempts or violence, jails often have multiple levels of security within a single facility, as compared to prisons, which often have specialized facilities for each security level.

Supermax prison facilities provide the highest level of prison security. These units hold those considered the most dangerous inmates, as well as inmates who have been deemed too high-profile or too great a national security risk for a normal prison. These include inmates who have committed assaults, murders, or other serious violations in less secure facilities, and inmates known to be or accused of being prison gang members. Most states have either a supermax section of a prison facility or an entire prison facility designated as a supermax. The United States Federal Bureau of Prisons operates a federal supermax, A.D.X. Florence, located in Florence, Colorado, also known as the "Alcatraz of the Rockies" and widely considered to be the most secure prison in the United States. A.D.X. Florence has a standard supermax section where assaultive, violent, and gang-related inmates are kept under normal supermax conditions of 23-hour confinement and abridged amenities. A.D.X. Florence is considered to be of a security level above that of all other prisons in the United States, at least in the "ideological" ultramax part of it, which features permanent, 24-hour solitary confinement with rare human contacts or opportunity to earn better conditions through good behavior.

In a maximum security prison or area (called high security in the federal system), all prisoners have individual cells with sliding doors controlled from a secure remote control station. Prisoners are allowed out of their cells for 1 out of every 24 hours (1 hour and 30 minutes for prisoners in California). When out of their cells, prisoners remain in the cell block or an exterior cage. Movement out of the cell block or "pod" is tightly restricted using restraints and escorts by correctional officers.

Incarceration Rate by State, 2016; excludes jail inmates.

Under close security, prisoners usually have one- or two-person cells operated from a remote control station. Each cell has its own toilet and sink. Inmates may leave their cells for work assignments or correctional programs and may otherwise be allowed in a common area in the cellblock or in an exercise yard. The fences are generally double fences with watchtowers housing armed guards, plus often a third, lethal-current electric fence in the middle.

Prisoners that fall into the medium security group may sleep in cells, but share them two and two, and use bunk beds with lockers to store their possessions. Depending upon the facility, each cell may have showers, toilets, and sinks. Cells are locked at night with one or more correctional officers supervising. There is less supervision of prisoners' internal movements. The perimeter is generally double-fenced and regularly patrolled.

Prisoners in minimum security facilities are considered to pose little physical risk to the public and are mainly non-violent "white collar criminals". Minimum-security prisoners live in less-secure dormitories, which correctional officers regularly patrol. As in medium security facilities, they have communal showers, toilets, and sinks. A minimum-security facility generally has a single fence that is watched, but not patrolled, by armed guards. At facilities in very remote and rural areas, there may be no fence at all. Prisoners may often work on community projects, such as roadside litter cleanup with the state department of transportation or wilderness conservation. Many minimum-security facilities are small camps located in or near military bases, larger prisons (outside the security perimeter), or other government institutions, providing a convenient supply of convict labor to those institutions. Many states allow persons in minimum-security facilities access to the Internet.

=== Correspondence ===
Inmates who maintain contact with family and friends in the outside world are less likely to be convicted of further crimes and usually have an easier reintegration period back into society. Inmates benefit from corresponding with friends and family members, especially when in-person visits are infrequent. However, guidelines exist as to what constitutes acceptable mail, and these policies are strictly enforced.

Mail sent to inmates in violation of prison policies can result in sanctions such as loss of imprisonment time reduced for good behavior. Most Department of Corrections websites provide detailed information regarding mail policies. These rules can even vary within a single prison, depending on which part of the prison an inmate is housed. For example, death row and maximum security inmates are usually under stricter mail guidelines for security reasons.

There have been several notable challenges to prison corresponding services. The Missouri Department of Corrections (DOC) stated that effective June 1, 2007, inmates would be prohibited from using pen pal websites, citing concerns that inmates were using them to solicit money and defraud the public. Service providers such as WriteAPrisoner.com, together with the ACLU, planned to challenge the ban in Federal Court. Similar bans on an inmate's rights or a website's right to post such information has been ruled unconstitutional in other courts, citing First Amendment freedoms. Some faith-based initiatives promote the positive effects of correspondence on inmates; some have made efforts to help ex-offenders reintegrate into society through job placement assistance. Inmates' ability to mail letters to other inmates has been limited by the courts.

=== Conditions ===
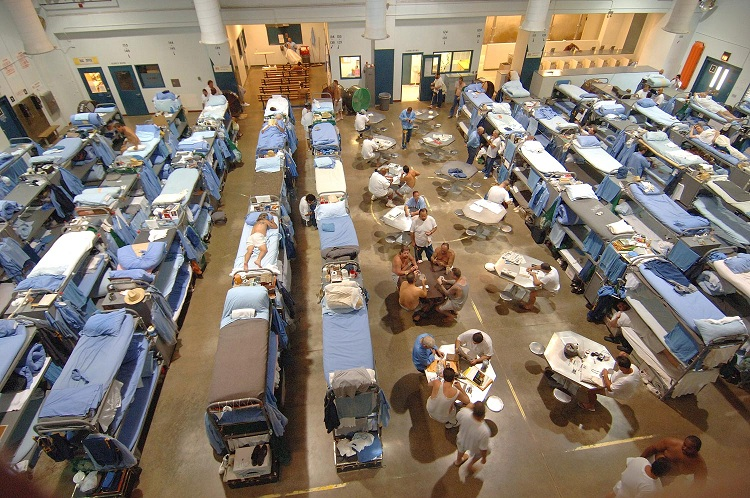
Living facilities in Mule Creek State Prison (2006)

The non-governmental organization Human Rights Watch claims that prisoners and detainees face "abusive, degrading and dangerous" conditions within local, state and federal facilities, including those operated by for-profit contractors. The organization also raised concerns with prisoner rape and medical care for inmates. In a survey of 1,788 male inmates in Midwestern prisons by Prison Journal, about 21% responded they had been coerced or pressured into sexual activity during their incarceration, and 7% that they had been raped in their current facility.

In August 2003, a Harper's article by Wil S. Hylton estimated that "somewhere between 20 and 40% of American prisoners are, at this very moment, infected with hepatitis C". Prisons may outsource medical care to private companies such as Correctional Medical Services (now Corizon) that, according to Hylton's research, try to minimize the amount of care given to prisoners to maximize profits. After the privatization of healthcare in Arizona's prisons, medical spending fell by 30 million dollars, and staffing was greatly reduced. Some 50 prisoners died in custody in the first 8 months of 2013, compared to 37 for the preceding two years combined.

The poor quality of food provided to inmates has become an issue, as over the last decade, corrections officials looking to cut costs have been outsourcing food services to corporations such as Aramark, A'Viands Food & Services Management, and ABL Management. A prison riot in Kentucky has been blamed on the low quality of food Aramark provided to inmates, which was tainted with worms and human feces. A 2017 study from the Centers for Disease Control and Prevention found that because of lapses in food safety, prison inmates are 6.4 times more likely to contract a food-related illness than the general population.

Also identified as an issue within the prison system is gang violence, because many gang members retain their gang identity and affiliations when imprisoned. Segregation of identified gang members from the general population of inmates, with different gangs being housed in separate units, often results in the imprisonment of these gang members with their friends and criminal cohorts. Some feel this has the effect of turning prisons into "institutions of higher criminal learning".

Many prisons in the United States are overcrowded. For example, California's 33 prisons have a total capacity of 100,000, but they hold 170,000 inmates. Many prisons in California and around the country are forced to turn old gymnasiums and classrooms into huge bunkhouses for inmates. They do this by placing hundreds of bunk beds side by side in these gyms, without barriers to separate inmates. In California, the inadequate security engendered by this situation, coupled with insufficient staffing levels, has led to increased violence and a prison health system that causes one death a week. This situation has led the courts to order California to release 27% of the current prison population, citing the Eighth Amendment's prohibition of cruel and unusual punishment. The three-judge court considering requests by the Plata v. Schwarzenegger and Coleman v. Schwarzenegger courts found California's prisons have become criminogenic as a result of prison overcrowding.

In 2005, the U.S. Supreme Court case Cutter v. Wilkinson established that prisons receiving federal funds could not deny prisoners accommodations necessary for religious practices.

According to a Supreme Court ruling issued on May 23, 2011, California – which has the highest overcrowding rate of any prison system in the country – must alleviate overcrowding in the state's prisons, reducing the prisoner population by 30,000 over the next two years.

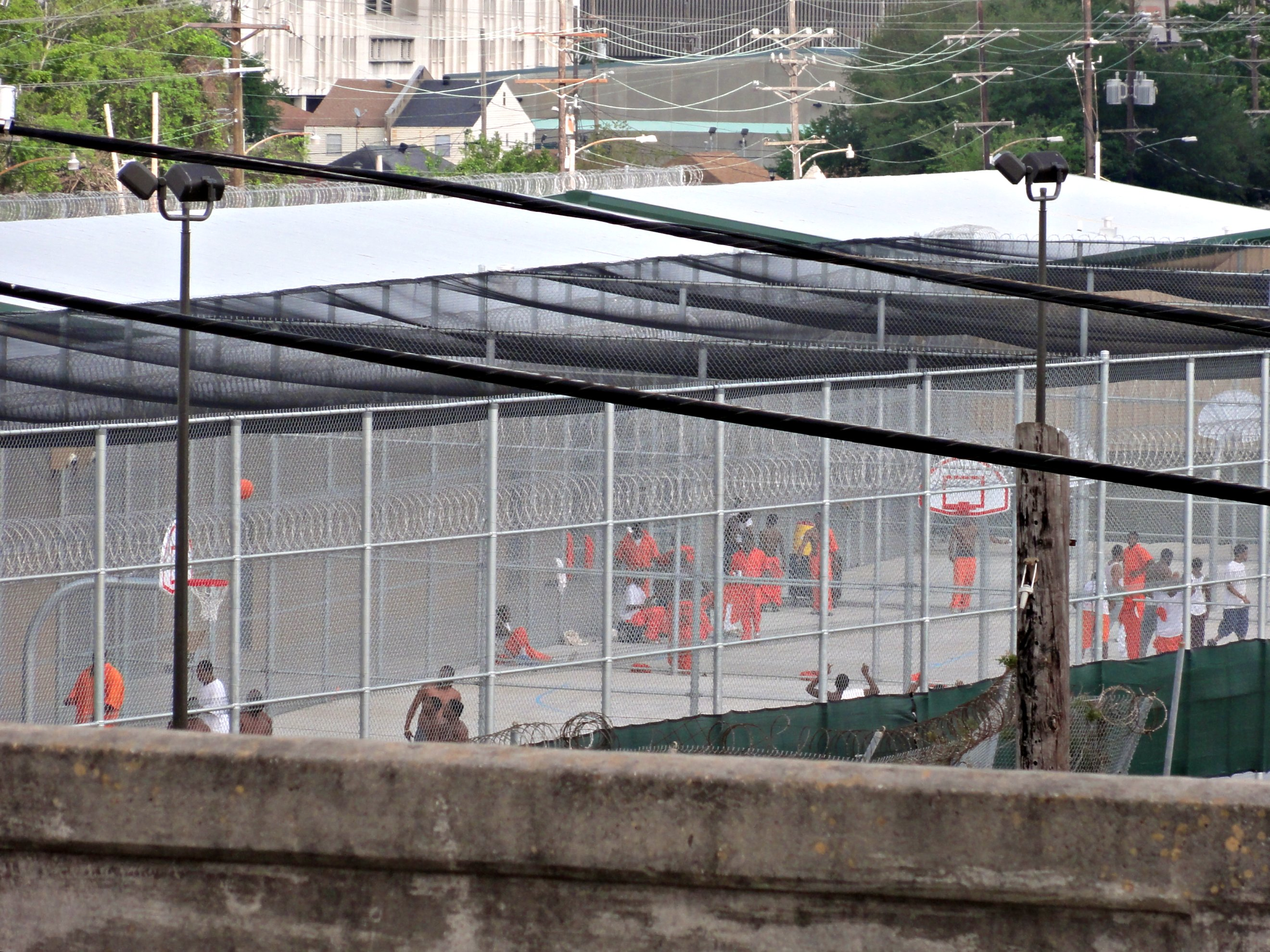
Inmates in an Orleans Parish Prison yard

Solitary confinement is widely used in U.S. prisons, yet it is underreported by most states, while some do not report it at all. Isolation of prisoners has been condemned by the UN in 2011 as a form of torture. At over 80,000 at any given time, the U.S. has more prisoners confined in isolation than any other country in the world. In Louisiana, with 843 prisoners per 100,000 citizens, there have been prisoners, such as the Angola Three, held for as long as forty years in isolation. A June 2023 study by Solitary Watch found that over 120,000 people on any given day are in solitary confinement in the United States. Researchers have analyzed data from a cross-sectional 2016 survey conducted by the US Bureau of Justice Statistics and found evidence that solitary confinement has been used disproportionately against inmates of marginalized racial and ethnic groups.

In 1999, the Supreme Court of Norway refused to extradite American hashish-smuggler Henry Hendricksen, as they declared that US prisons do not meet their minimum humanitarian standards.

In 2011, some 885 people died while being held in local jails (not in prisons after being convicted of a crime and sentenced) throughout the United States. According to federal statistics, roughly 4,400 inmates die in U.S. prisons and jails annually, excluding executions.

As of September 2013, condoms for prisoners are only available in the U.S. State of Vermont (on September 17, 2013, the California Senate approved a bill for condom distribution inside the state's prisons, but the bill was not yet law at the time of approval) and in county jails in San Francisco.

In September 2016, a group of corrections officers at Holman Correctional Facility went on strike over safety concerns and overcrowding. Prisoners refer to the facility as a "slaughterhouse" as stabbings are a routine occurrence.

The U.S. Department of Justice filed a lawsuit against the state of Alabama along with the Alabama Department of Corrections in December of 2020 over unconstitutional conditions within their prisons. The lawsuit followed a federal investigation into prisoner complaints that alleged failure by the prison system to provide "adequate protection from prisoner-on-prisoner violence and prisoner-on-prisoner sexual abuse", safe and sanitary conditions as well as allegations of prison staff using excessive force on inmates.

During the coronavirus disease 2019 (COVID-19) pandemic in the U.S., the Centers for Disease Control and Prevention (CDC) requested health data from 54 state and territorial health department jurisdictions. 32 (86%) of 37 jurisdictions that responded reported at least one confirmed COVID-19 case among inmates or staff members. As of April 21, 2020, there were 4,893 cases and 88 deaths among inmates and 2,778 cases and 15 deaths among staff members.

==== Conditions for women ====
The prison conditions for women are often poor. Because prisons are male-dominated, a larger portion of the resources is allocated toward them. Another major issue that women face in prisons is sexual assault, which often comes from guards. Although this is a major issue for women, these assaults rarely receive adequate attention, and victims are often left without support.

According to Angela Davis in "Are Prisons Obsolete?", the prison industrial complex and mass incarceration are shaped by gender. There are significant differences in the treatment of imprisoned men and women. Women suffer physical, mental, and emotional trauma, including sexual abuse and a lack of resources for their intimate needs. Female inmates are not guaranteed access to contraceptives or preventative gynecologic exams despite their higher risk of sexual violence and sexually transmitted infections. In prison, women are dehumanized and treated like objects, a practice that has become normalized. Like many other socio-political issues, women are largely absent from discussions of prison reform. The experiences of incarcerated women are rarely considered. Women are degraded to an extreme degree, and sexual abuse is often perpetrated by the guards and officers charged with overseeing them. They are sexualized and are often sentenced to longer terms than men.

According to Davis, "masculine criminality has always been deemed more "normal" than feminine criminality." When a woman commits a crime, it is not as common, and so it is practically considered psychotic. Because of this, "deviant women have been constructed as insane." Women are treated as if their crimes are more irrational because of their gender. Women are even more inclined to be imprisoned in psychiatric hospitals than men, as well as to be prescribed psychiatric treatment.

=== Privatization ===
Before the 1980s, private prisons did not exist in the U.S. During the 1980s, as a result of the war on drugs by the Reagan Administration, the number of people incarcerated rose. This created a demand for more prison space. The result was the development of privatization and the for-profit prison industry.

A 1998 study was conducted in three comparable Louisiana medium-security prisons, two of which were privately run by different corporations, and one was publicly run. The data from this study suggested that the privately run prisons operated more cost-effectively without sacrificing the safety of inmates and staff. The study concluded that both privately run prisons had a lower cost per inmate, a lower rate of critical incidents, a safer environment for employees and inmates, and a higher proportional rate of inmates who completed basic education, literacy, and vocational training courses. However, the publicly run prison outperformed the privately run prisons in areas such as experiencing fewer escape attempts, controlling substance abuse through testing, offering a wider range of educational and vocational courses, and providing a broader range of treatment, recreation, social services, and rehabilitative services.

According to Marie Gottschalk, a professor of political science at the University of Pennsylvania, studies that claim private prisons are cheaper to run than public prisons fail to "take into account the fundamental differences between private and public facilities," and that the prison industry "engages in a lot of cherry-picking and cost-shifting to maintain the illusion that the private sector does it better for less." The American Civil Liberties Union reported in 2013 that numerous studies indicate private jails are actually filthier, more violent, less accountable, and possibly more costly than their public counterparts. The ACLU stated that the for-profit prison industry is "a major contributor to bloated state budgets and mass incarceration – not a part of any viable solution to these urgent problems." The primary reason Louisiana is the prison capital of the world is because of the for-profit prison industry. According to The Times-Picayune, "a majority of Louisiana inmates are housed in for-profit facilities, which must be supplied with a constant influx of human beings or a $182 million industry will go bankrupt."

In Mississippi, a 2013 Bloomberg report stated that assault rates in private facilities were three times higher on average than in their public counterparts. In 2012, the for-profit Walnut Grove Youth Correctional Facility was the most violent prison in the state, with 27 assaults per 100 offenders. A federal lawsuit filed by the ACLU and the Southern Poverty Law Center on behalf of prisoners at the privately run East Mississippi Correctional Facility in 2013 claims the conditions there are "hyper-violent", "barbaric" and "chaotic", with gangs routinely beating and exploiting mentally ill inmates who are denied medical care by prison staff. A May 2012 riot in the Corrections Corporation of America-run Adams County Correctional Facility, also in Mississippi, left one corrections officer dead and dozens injured. Similar riots have occurred in privatized facilities in Idaho, Oklahoma, New Mexico, Florida, California, and Texas.

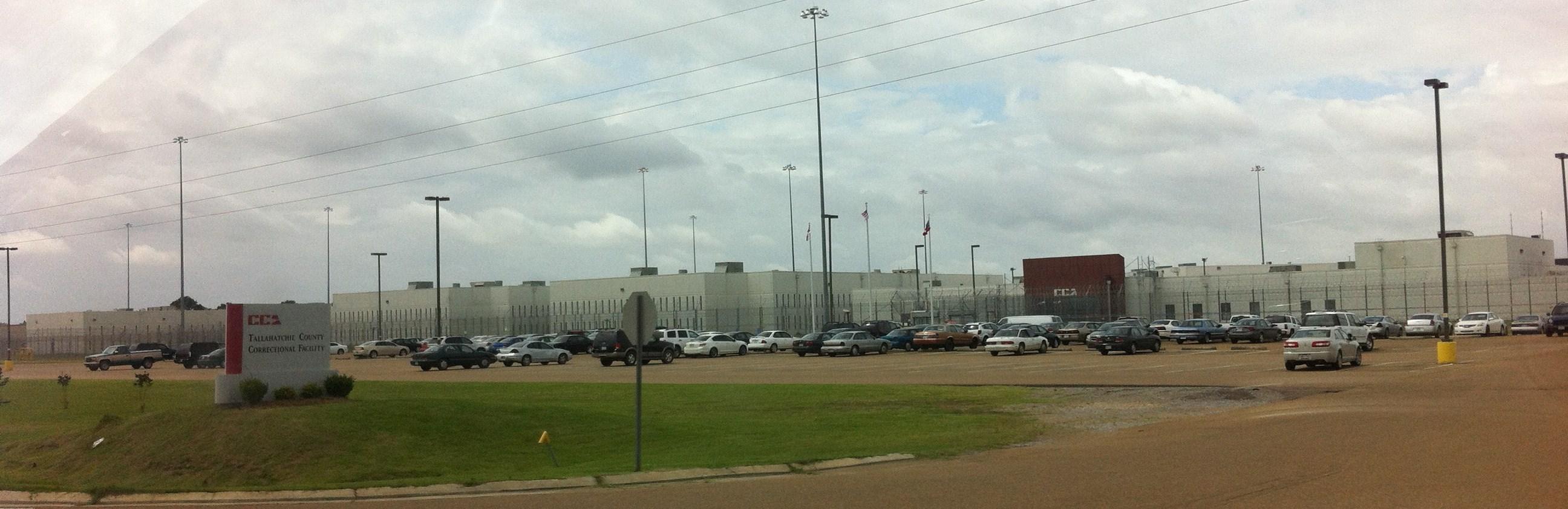
Tallahatchie County Correctional Facility in Mississippi, operated by Corrections Corporation of America (CCA).

Sociologist John L. Campbell of Dartmouth College claims that private prisons in the U.S. have become "a lucrative business". Between 1990 and 2000, the number of private facilities grew from five to 100, operated by nearly 20 private firms. Over the same time period the stock price of the industry leader, Corrections Corporation of America (CCA), which rebranded as CoreCivic in 2016 amid increased scrutiny of the private prison industry, climbed from $8 a share to $30. According to journalist Matt Taibbi, major investors in the prison industry include Wells Fargo, Bank of America, Fidelity Investments, General Electric and The Vanguard Group. The aforementioned Bloomberg report also notes that in the past decade, the number of inmates in for-profit prisons throughout the U.S. rose 44 percent.

Controversy has surrounded the privatization of prisons with the exposure of the genesis of the landmark Arizona SB 1070 law. This law was written by Arizona State Congressman Russell Pearce and the CCA at a meeting of the American Legislative Exchange Council (ALEC) in the Grand Hyatt in Washington, D.C. Both CCA and GEO Group, the two largest operators of private facilities, have been contributors to ALEC, which lobbies for policies that would increase incarceration, such as three-strike laws and "truth-in-sentencing" legislation. In fact, in the early 1990s, when CCA was co-chair of ALEC, it co-sponsored (with the National Rifle Association) the so-called "truth-in-sentencing" and "three-strikes-you're-out" laws. Truth-in-sentencing called for all violent offenders to serve 85 percent of their sentences before being eligible for release; three strikes called for mandatory life imprisonment for a third felony conviction. Some prison officers' unions in publicly run facilities, such as the California Correctional Peace Officers Association, have also, in the past, supported measures such as three-strike laws. Such laws increased the prison population.

In addition to CCA and GEO Group, companies operating in the private prison business include Management and Training Corporation and Community Education Centers. The GEO Group was formerly known as the Wackenhut Corrections division. It includes the former Correctional Services Corporation and Cornell Companies, which were acquired by GEO in 2005 and 2010, respectively. Such companies often sign contracts with states obliging them to fill prison beds or reimburse them for those that go unused.

Private companies that provide services to prisons are members of the American Correctional Association, a 501(c)(3) that advocates legislation favorable to the industry. Such private companies comprise what has been termed the prison–industrial complex. An example of this phenomenon would be the Kids for cash scandal, in which two judges in Luzerne County, Pennsylvania, Mark Ciavarella and Michael Conahan, were receiving judicial kickbacks for sending youths, convicted of minor crimes, to a privatized, for-profit juvenile facility run by the Mid Atlantic Youth Service Corporation.

The industry is aware of what reduced crime rates could mean to their bottom line. This from the CCA's SEC report in 2010:

Our growth … depends on several factors we cannot control, including crime rates …[R]eductions in crime rates … could lead to reductions in arrests, convictions and sentences requiring incarceration at correctional facilities.

Marie Gottschalk claims that while private prison companies and other economic interests were not the primary drivers of mass incarceration originally, they do much to sustain it today. The private prison industry has successfully lobbied for changes that increase the profit of their employers. They have opposed measures that would reduce sentences or shorten prison terms. The private prison industry has been accused of being at least partly responsible for America's high rates of incarceration.

According to The Corrections Yearbook, 2000, the average annual starting salary for public corrections officers was $23,002, compared to $17,628 for private correctional officers. The poor pay is a likely factor in the high turnover rate in private prisons, at 52.2 percent compared to 16 percent in public facilities.

In September 2015, Senator Bernie Sanders introduced the "Justice Is Not for Sale" Act, which would prohibit the United States government at federal, state, and local levels from contracting with private firms to provide and/or operate detention facilities within two years.

An August 2016 report by the U.S. Department of Justice asserts that privately operated federal facilities are less safe, less secure, and more punitive than other federal prisons. Shortly after this report was published, the DoJ announced it would stop using private prisons. On February 23, the DOJ under Attorney General Jeff Sessions overturned the ban on using private prisons. According to Sessions, "the (Obama administration) memorandum changed long-standing policy and practice, and impaired the bureau's ability to meet the future needs of the federal correctional system. Therefore, I direct the bureau to return to its previous approach." The private prison industry has been booming under the Trump administration.

On January 26, 2021, President Joe Biden issued Executive Order 14006, reversing the Trump-era policy by directing the Department of Justice not to renew private prison contracts. However, it was again overturned by Donald Trump shortly after retaking office on January 20, 2025.

Additionally, both CCA and GEO Group have been expanding into the immigrant detention market. Although the combined revenues of CCA and GEO Group were about $4 billion in 2017 from private prison contracts, their number one customer was ICE.

=== Labor ===
About 18% of eligible prisoners held in federal prisons are employed by UNICOR and are paid less than $1.25 an hour. Prisons have gradually become a source of low-wage labor for corporations seeking to outsource work to inmates. Corporations that use prison labor include Walmart, Eddie Bauer, Victoria's Secret, Microsoft, Starbucks, McDonald's, Nintendo, Chevron Corporation, Bank of America, Koch Industries, Boeing and Costco Wholesale.

Initially, laws passed during the New Deal prohibited the use of prison labor, except in state institutions. However, corporate lobbying eventually enabled them to use prison labor by 1979, and by 1995, businesses won exemptions from minimum-wage laws.

It is estimated that one in nine state government employees works in corrections. As the overall U.S. prison population declined in 2010, states are closing prisons. For instance, Virginia has removed 11 prisons since 2009. Like other small towns, Boydton in Virginia has to contend with unemployment woes resulting from the closure of the Mecklenburg Correctional Center.

In 2010, Prisoners in Georgia participated in the 2010 Georgia prison strike to secure greater rights.

In September 2016, large, coordinated prison strikes took place in 11 states, with inmates claiming they are subjected to poor sanitary conditions and jobs that amount to forced labor and modern-day slavery. Organizers, which include the Industrial Workers of the World labor union, asserted that it was the largest prison strike in U.S. history.

Starting August 21, 2018, another prison strike, sponsored by Jailhouse Lawyers Speak and the Incarcerated Workers Organizing Committee, took place in 17 states from coast to coast to protest what inmates regard as unfair treatment by the criminal justice system. In particular, inmates objected to being excluded from the 13th amendment, which forces them to work for pennies a day, a condition they assert is tantamount to modern-day slavery. The strike was the result of a call to action after a deadly riot occurred at Lee Correctional Institution in April of that year, which was sparked by neglect and inhumane living conditions.

According to a 2022 report by the ACLU, prison labor produces $11 billion worth of goods and services annually, with inmates often being forced to work dangerous jobs with no labor protections and little training, and are compensated with pennies per hour or sometimes nothing at all.

In 2023, a nationwide movement was called to close the 'slavery loophole' in the 13th Amendment, allowing an exception for punishment of crime. According to constitutional scholars, the 13th Amendment had been violated, as most US states forced inmates to work for no or minimal compensation.

An analysis of the International Trade Union Confederation's report indicates that the United States has not effectively adhered to the labor conventions it has ratified, thereby failing to realize its commitments to the protection of workers' rights.

=== Cost ===
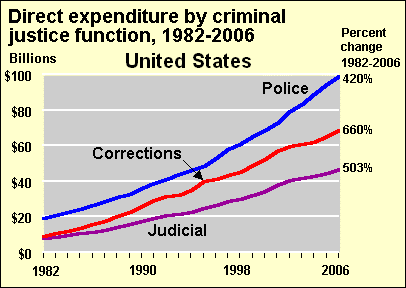
U.S. Bureau of Justice Statistics. Not adjusted for inflation. To view the inflation-adjusted data, see chart.

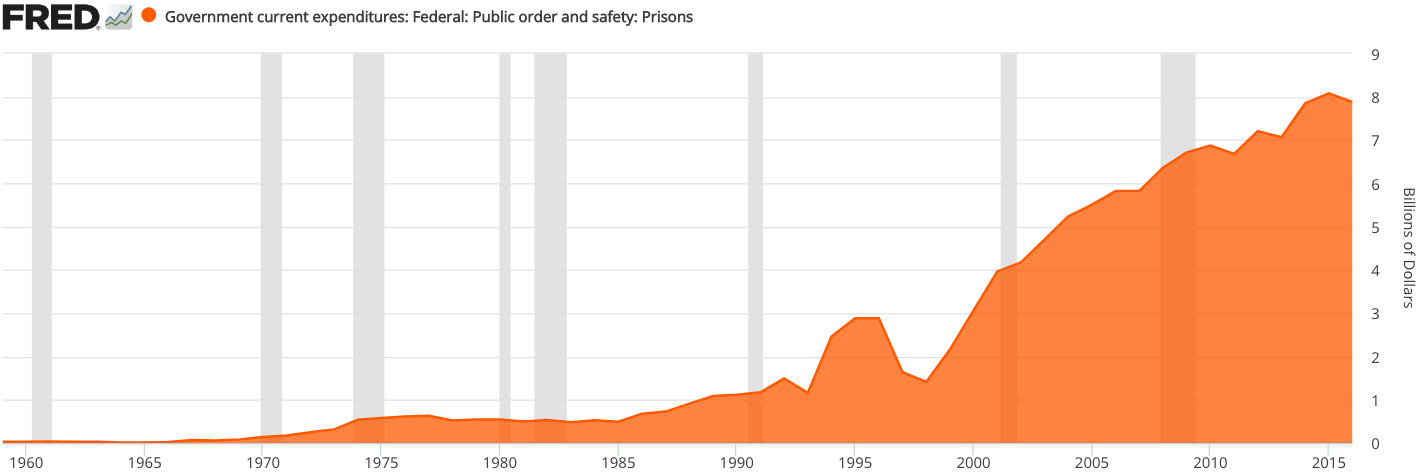
Federal prison yearly cost

Judicial, police, and corrections costs totaled $212 billion in 2011 according to the U.S. Census Bureau. In 2007, around $74 billion was spent on corrections according to the U.S. Bureau of Justice Statistics. Despite federal statistics including statements made by former Attorney General Eric Holder, according to research on corrections expenditure published in the ▲Church white paper "On Security", Federal Prisons and Detention FY15 Requested Budget was just $8.5 billion. Federal Bureau of Prisons' spending was $6.9 billion counting 20,911 correctional officers of 43,297 positions. Total U.S. States' and Federal Prisons and Detention including county jail subsidies was only $56.9 billion. Adding local jails' spending, $64.9 billion was spent on corrections in nominal 2014 dollars.

In fiscal year 2014, among facilities operated by the Federal Bureau of Prisons, the average cost of incarceration for federal inmates was $30,619.85. The average annual cost to confine an inmate in a residential re-entry center was $28,999.25.

State prisons averaged $31,286 per inmate in 2010, according to a Vera Institute of Justice study. It ranged from $14,603 in Kentucky to $60,076 in New York.

In California in 2008, it cost the state an average of $47,102 a year to incarcerate an inmate in a state prison. From 2001 to 2009, the average annual cost increased by about $19,500.

Housing the approximately 500,000 people in jail in the U.S. awaiting trial who cannot afford bail costs $9 billion a year. Most jail inmates are petty, nonviolent offenders. In the early 1990s, most nonviolent defendants were released on their own recognizance (trusted to show up at trial). Now most are given bail, and most pay a bail bond agent to afford it. 62% of local jail inmates are awaiting trial. This rate varies from state to state. As of 2019, Illinois has the highest rate with 89% of inmates in local jails unconvicted.

Bondsmen have lobbied to cut back local pretrial programs from Texas to California, pushed for legislation in four states limiting pretrial's resources, and lobbied Congress so that they won't have to pay the bond if the defendant commits a new crime. Behind them, the bondsmen have powerful special-interest group and millions of dollars. Pretrial release agencies have a smattering of public employees and the remnants of their once-thriving programs.

— National Public Radio, January 22, 2010.

To ease jail overcrowding in more than 10 counties each year, consider building new jails. As an example, Lubbock County, Texas, has decided to build a $110 million megajail to ease overcrowding. Jail costs an average of $60 a day nationally. In Broward County, Florida, supervised pretrial release costs about $7 a day per person, while jail costs $115 a day. The jail system costs a quarter of every county tax dollar in Broward County and is the county's largest taxpayer expense.

The National Association of State Budget Officers reports: "In fiscal 2009, corrections spending represented 3.4 percent of total state spending and 7.2 percent of general fund spending." They also report: "Some states exclude certain items when reporting corrections expenditures. Twenty-one states wholly or partially excluded juvenile delinquency counseling from their corrections figures, and fifteen states wholly or partially excluded spending on juvenile institutions. Seventeen states wholly or partially excluded spending on drug abuse rehabilitation centers, and forty-one states wholly or partially excluded spending on institutions for the criminally insane. Twenty-two states wholly or partially excluded aid to local governments for jails. For details, see Table 36."

As of 2007, the cost of medical care for inmates was growing by 10 percent annually.

According to a 2016 study by researchers at Washington University in St. Louis, the true cost of incarceration exceeds $1 trillion, with half of that falling on the families, children, and communities of those incarcerated.

According to a 2016 analysis of federal data by the U.S. Education Department, state and local spending on incarceration has grown three times as much as spending on public education since 1980.

== Effects ==
Property crime rates in the United States per 100,000 population beginning in 1960 (source: Bureau of Justice Statistics)

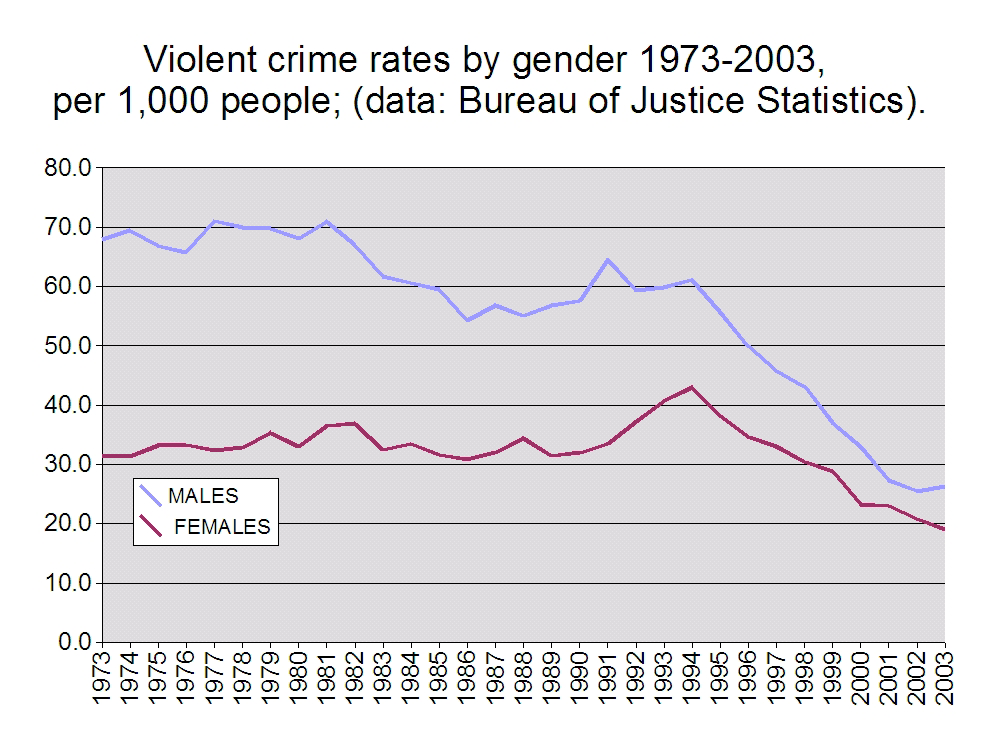
Violent crime rates by gender 1973–2003

=== Crime ===
The 2021 meta-analysis by Damon M. Petrich, Travis C. Pratt, Cheryl Lero Jonson, and Francis T. Cullen, based on 116 studies and approximately 4.5 million individuals across 15 countries, found that custodial sanctions (such as prison or jail) do not reduce recidivism compared to non-custodial alternatives. On average, the effect is either null or slightly criminogenic, corresponding to roughly an 8 percentage-point higher rate of reoffending among those who are incarcerated. These findings are consistent across different methodologies, sample characteristics, and national contexts, including more rigorous quasi-experimental designs. Factors such as disrupted social ties, reduced employment opportunities, and exposure to criminogenic environments are identified as likely mechanisms contributing to this effect.

A 2002 meta-analysis by Paula Smith, Claire Goggin, and Paul Gendreau, synthesizing 117 studies conducted between 1958 and 2002 and involving 442,471 offenders, examined the relationship between incarceration and recidivism. The findings indicate that incarceration does not reduce recidivism and is associated with a small increase in reoffending (a slight criminogenic effect). No consistent differences were found across subgroups such as youth, women, or ethnic minorities, leading the authors to conclude that prison sentences should not be expected to reduce criminal behavior.

According to Liedka, Piehl, and Useem, imprisonment reduces crime at low levels but exhibits diminishing marginal returns that accelerate. At higher levels, the effect weakens substantially and can be reversed, becoming slightly crime-increasing. They argue that the U.S. has already reached the point where further prison expansion no longer serves a reasonable crime-control purpose.

A 2002 study by DeFina and Arvanites analyzed each state separately from 1971 to 1998. They found that increasing incarceration had no statistically significant effect in most states for any of the seven crimes studied. The authors recommend reconsidering prison expansion as the primary crime-control strategy.

A 2003 study by Clear, Rose, Waring, and Scully tested whether high incarceration rates increase neighborhood crime through "coercive mobility." They found that at low levels, prison admissions slightly reduce crime, but beyond a tipping point, additional admissions increase crime. Releases back into the community also raise crime the following year. The authors conclude that concentrated incarceration destabilizes communities and can be counterproductive for public safety.

A 2010 study of panel data from 1978 to 2003 indicated that the crime-reducing effects of increasing incarceration are totally offset by the crime-increasing effects of prisoner re-entry.

According to a 2015 study by the Brennan Center for Justice, falling crime rates cannot be ascribed to mass incarceration.

=== Society ===
Within three years of being released, 67% of ex-prisoners are re-arrested, and 52% are re-incarcerated, according to a study based on 1994 data. Former inmate Wenona Thompson argues "I realized that I became part of a cycle, a system, that looked forward to seeing me there. And I was aware that ... I would be one of those people who fill up their prisons".

In 1995, the government allocated $5.1 billion for new prison space. Every $100 million spent in construction costs $53 million per year in finance and operational costs over the next three decades. The government spends nearly $60 billion a year for prisons, and in 2005, it cost an average of $23,876 a year to house a prisoner. It takes about $30,000 per year per person to provide drug rehabilitation treatment to inmates. By contrast, the cost of drug rehabilitation treatment outside of a prison costs about $8,000 per year per person.

In 2016, over 6 million Americans had lost their right to vote for conviction of a felony. In addition, people who have been recently released from prison are ineligible for welfare in most states. They are not eligible for subsidized housing and must wait 2 years to become eligible for Section 8. It can be difficult for people to find employment, as employers often check a potential employee's criminal record. Formerly incarcerated individuals may experience employment discrimination, and frequently have smaller social networks. This contributes to their struggle to find employment upon release into the community.

In The New Jim Crow in 2011, legal scholar and advocate Michelle Alexander contended that the U.S. incarceration system worked to bar Black men from voting. She wrote "there are more African Americans under correctional control – in prison or jail, on probation or parole – than were enslaved in 1850, a decade before the Civil War began". Alexander's work has drawn increased attention in the years since.

Yale Law Professor, and opponent of mass incarceration James Forman Jr. has countered that 1) African Americans, as represented by such cities as the District of Columbia, have generally supported tough on crime policies. 2) There appears to be a connection between drugs and violent crimes, the discussion of which, he says, New Jim Crow theorists have avoided. 3) New theorists have overlooked class as a factor in incarceration. Black people with advanced degrees have fewer convictions, and Black people without advanced education have more.

=== Family ===
Incarceration of an individual does not have a singular effect: it affects those in the individual's tight-knit circle as well. For every mother that is incarcerated in the United States, there are about another ten people (children, grandparents, community, etc.) that are directly affected. Moreover, more than 2.7 million children in the United States have an incarcerated parent. That translates to one out of every 27 children in the United States having an incarcerated parent. Approximately 80 percent of women who go to jail each year are mothers. This ripple effect on the individual's family amplifies the debilitating effect that entails arresting individuals. Given the general vulnerability and naivete of children, it is important to understand how such a traumatic event adversely affects children. The effects of a parent's incarceration on their children have been found as early as three years old. Local and state governments in the United States have recognized these harmful effects and have attempted to address them through public policy solutions.

==== Impact on children ====
The effects of an early traumatic experience of a child can be categorized into health effects and behavioral externalizations. Many studies have searched for a correlation between witnessing a parent's arrest and a wide variety of physiological issues. For example, Lee et al. showed a significant correlation between high cholesterol, migraines, and HIV/AIDS diagnosis in children with a parental incarceration. Even while adjusting for various socioeconomic and racial factors, children with an incarcerated parent have a significantly higher chance of developing a wide variety of physical problems such as obesity, asthma, and developmental delays. The current literature acknowledges that there are a variety of poor health outcomes as a direct result of being separated from a parent by law enforcement. It is hypothesized that the chronic stress that results directly from the uncertainty of the parent's legal status is the primary influence for the extensive list of acute and chronic conditions that could develop later in life. In addition to the chronic stress, the immediate instability in a child's life deprives them of certain essentials e.g. money for food and parental love that are compulsory for leading a healthy life. Though most of the adverse effects that result from parental incarceration are the same regardless of whether the mother or father was arrested, some differences have been discovered. For example, males whose father has been incarcerated display more behavioral issues than any other combination of parent/child.

There has also been a substantial effort to understand how this traumatic experience manifests in the child's mental health and to identify externalizations that may be helpful for a diagnosis. The most prominent mental health outcomes in these children are anxiety disorders, depression (mood), and post-traumatic stress disorder(PTSD). These problems worsen in a typical positive feedback loop without the presence of a parental figure. Given the chronic nature of these diseases, they can be detected and observed at distinct points in a child's development, allowing researchers to determine whether additional health services can be used to intervene and reduce the risk of future health challenges. Murray et al. have been able to isolate the cause of the expression of Anti-social behaviours specific to the parental incarceration. In a specific case study in Boston by Sack, within two months of the father being arrested, the adolescent boy in the family developed severe aggressive and antisocial behaviors. This observation is not unique; Sack and other researchers have noticed an immediate and strong reaction to sudden departures from family structure norms. These behavioral externalizations are most evident at school when the child interacts with peers and adults. This behavior leads to punishment and less focus on education, which has obvious consequences for future educational and career prospects.

In addition to externalizing undesirable behaviors, children of incarcerated parents are more likely to be incarcerated compared to those without incarcerated parents. More formally, transmission of severe emotional strain on a parent negatively impacts the children by disrupting the home environment. Societal stigma against individuals, specifically parents, who are incarcerated is passed down to their children. The children find this stigma to be overwhelming, and it negatively impacts their short- and long-term prospects.

It has been reported that in 2024, in the United States, there were more than 5 million children of incarcerated parents; 24% of Black children, 11% of Hispanic, and 4% of White. Financial effects on children of incarcerated parents include housing insecurity and financial strain. Emotional effect also includes the transference of stigma, as there is a bias towards those who have had interactions with the criminal justice system. In addition to greater behavioral problems, children of incarcerated parents are more likely to have poor sleep hygiene. It has been reported that children of incarcerated parents are less likely to adhere to a bedtime schedule, and are more likely to have a shorter sleep duration. Children of incarcerated parents are more likely to have involvement with the criminal justice system, and "For African American and Hispanic male adolescents, having a father incarcerated was associated with significantly greater likelihood of children (i.e., sons) being arrested before 25 years of age compared to adolescents who did not have a father incarcerated." Children of incarcerated parents are also more likely to engage in drug use, and male children were more likely to use drugs "by a factor of 2.20 and female children were nearly 7 times (odds ratio [OR] = 6.89) more likely to have used illegal drugs in their lifetime compared to children who did not have an incarcerated father". Limited research has been conducted specific to the effects to Black children of incarcerated parents, but due to socioeconomic and cultural differences is an area for research to be expanded. Gatewood, Muhammad, and Turner (2025) suggest that the parameters for analyzing Black children with incarcerated parents should be adjusted. Their study indicates "a counternarrative to what adult BCOIPs view as success and elevates their experiences from their viewpoint. Their definitions of success include their relationships with others, giving back to the community, educational backgrounds, and improving their mental health."

=== Health ===
With rising levels of mass incarceration, the prison population faces significant health issues while incarcerated. Health surveys of inmates show that the prison population faces higher rates of chronic and infectious diseases, mental illness, and substance use disorders than the general U.S. population. Based on analysis of the 2002-4 Survey of Inmates in Local Jails, incarcerated individuals had higher rates of hypertension, diabetes, myocardial infarction, asthma, arthritis, cervical cancer, and hepatitis. The prison environment exacerbates chronic health conditions since they cannot be properly addressed and due to the stress of social isolation. In addition, low-income and POC populations are often more susceptible to poor health outcomes due to social determinants of health before incarceration, such as poor nutrition, lower average levels of education, higher levels of community violence and drug use, and lower rates of healthcare access.

The incarcerated population also has lower rates of health literacy. A 2016 study found that over 60% of patients had inadequate health literacy in a sample of formerly incarcerated individuals. According to the Health Resources & Services Administration, health literacy is the ability to obtain, process, and understand health information to make appropriate health decisions. In the incarcerated population, low health literacy is linked with decreased confidence in taking medications, increased likelihood of emergency department visits, and difficulty self-managing chronic health conditions.

=== Policy solutions ===
Four main phases can be distinguished in the process of arresting a parent: arrest, sentencing, incarceration, and re-entry. Re-entry is not relevant if a parent is not arrested for other crimes. During each of these phases, solutions can be implemented to mitigate harm to the children. While their parents are away, children rely on other caretakers (family or friends) to satisfy their basic needs. Solutions for the children of incarcerated parents have identified caretakers as a focal point for successful intervention.

==== Arrest phase ====
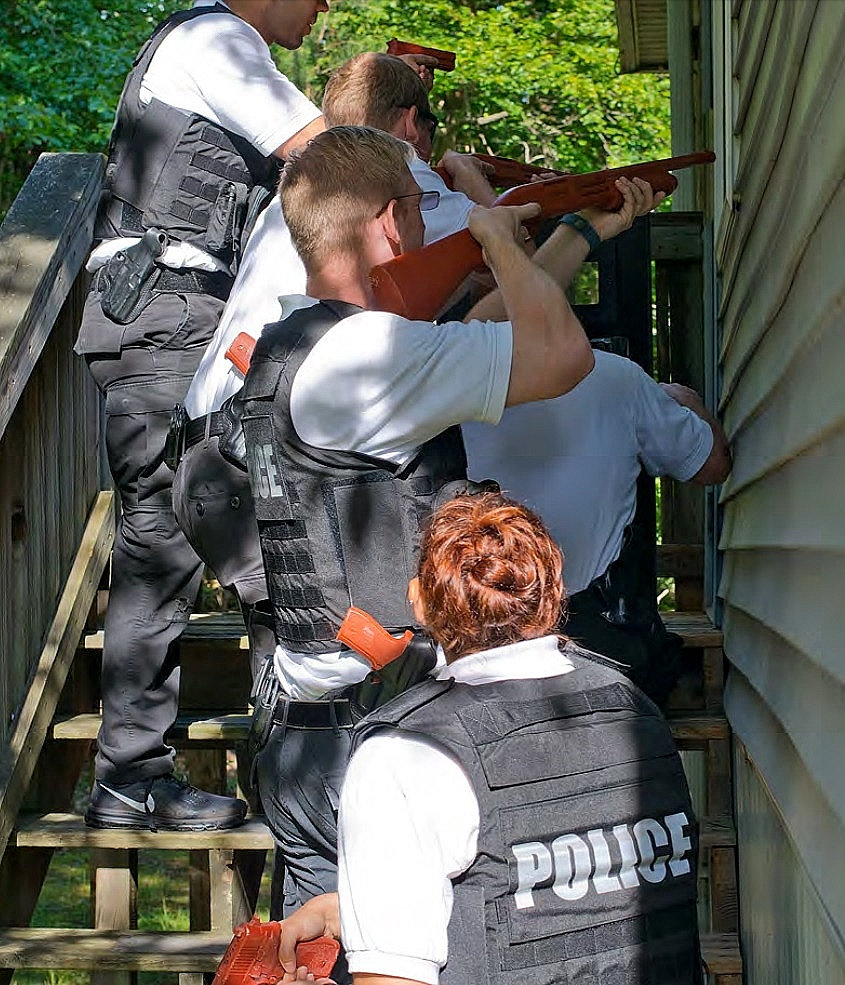
Forced home entry is a primary stressor for children in a residence.

One in five children witnesses their parent being arrested by authorities, and a study interviewing 30 children reported that the children experienced flashbulb memories and nightmares associated with the day their parent was arrested. These single, adverse moments have long-reaching effects, and policymakers around the country have attempted to ameliorate the situation. For example, in 2005, the city of San Francisco implemented training policies for its police officers to make them more cognizant of the familial situation before entering a home. The guidelines go a step further, stipulating that if no information is available before the arrest, officers should ask the suspect whether there are any children in the house. San Francisco is not alone: New Mexico passed a law in 2009 advocating for child safety during parental arrest and California provides funding to agencies to train personnel how to conduct an arrest in the presence of family members appropriately. Extending past the state level, the Department of Justice has provided guidelines for police officers around the country to accommodate children in difficult family situations.

==== Sentencing phase ====
During the sentencing phase, the judge is the primary authority in determining the appropriate punishment. Considering the sentencing effects on the defendant's children could help preserve the parent-child relationship. A law passed in Oklahoma in 2014 requires judges to inquire whether convicted individuals are single custodial parents and, if so, to authorize the mobility of important resources so that the child's transition to different circumstances is monitored. The distance that the jail or prison is from the arrested individual's home is a contributing factor to the parent-child relationship. Allowing a parent to serve their sentence closer to their residence allows for easier visitation and a healthier relationship. Recognizing this, the New York Senate passed a bill in 2015 to ensure convicted individuals are jailed at the nearest facility.

In 1771, Baron Auckland wrote in Principles of Penal Law that: "Imprisonment, inflicted by law as a punishment, is not according to the principles of wise legislation. It sinks useful subjects into burdens on the community, and has always a bad effect on their morals: nor can it communicate the benefit of example, being in its nature secluded from the eye of the people."

==== Incarceration phase ====
While serving a sentence, measures have been put in place to enable parents to fulfill their duties as role models and caretakers. New York allows newborns to be with their mothers for up to one year. Studies have shown that parental, specifically maternal, presence during a newborn's early development is crucial to both physical and cognitive development. Ohio law requires nursery support for pregnant inmates in its facilities. California also has a stake in the support of incarcerated parents, too, through its requirement that women in jail with children be transferred to a community facility that can provide pediatric care. These regulations are supported by the research on early child development that argues infants and young children must be with a parental figure, preferably the mother, to ensure proper development. This approach received support at the federal level when then-Deputy Attorney General Sally Yates instituted several family-friendly measures, for certain facilities, including: improving infrastructure for video conferencing and informing inmates on how to contact their children if they were placed in the foster care system, among other improvements.

==== Re-entry phase ====
The last phase of the incarceration process is re-entry back into the community, but more importantly, back into the family structure. Though the time away is painful for the family, it does not always welcome back the previously incarcerated individual with open arms. Not only is the transition into the family difficult, but also into society as they are faced with establishing secure housing, insurance, and a new job. As such, policymakers find it necessary to ease the transition of an incarcerated individual to the pre-arrest situation. Of the four outlined phases, re-entry is the least emphasized from a public policy perspective. This is not to say it is the least important, however, as there are concerns that time in a correctional facility can deteriorate the caretaking ability of some prisoners. As a result, Oklahoma has made measurable strides by providing parents with the tools they need to re-enter their families, including parenting classes.

=== Caretakers ===
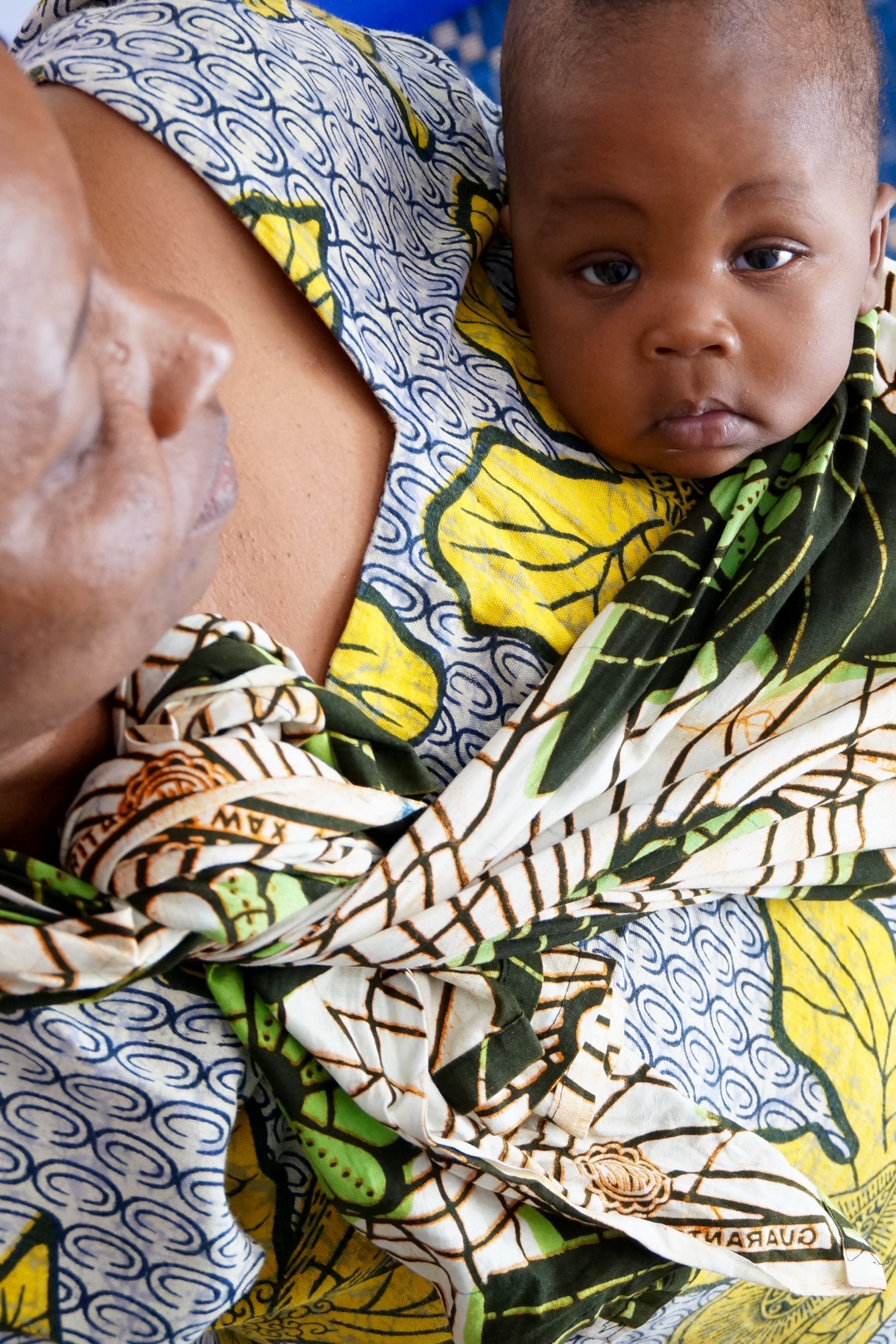
Grandmothers are a common caregiver of children with an incarcerated parent.

Though the effects on caregivers of these children vary based on factors such as the relationship to the prisoner and their support system, it is well known that it is a financial and emotional burden to take care of a child. In addition to taking care of their nuclear family, caregivers are now responsible for another individual who requires attention and resources to flourish. Depending on the child's relationship with the caregiver, the transition to a new household may not be easy. The rationale for targeting caregivers in intervention policies is to ensure that children's new environment is healthy and productive. The federal government funds states to provide counseling to caretaking family members, alleviating some of the associated emotional burden. A more comprehensive program in Washington (state) employs "kinship navigators" to address caretakers' needs through initiatives such as parenting classes and connections to legal services.

=== Employment ===
Felony records greatly influence the chances of people finding employment. Many employers seem to use criminal history as a screening mechanism without attempting to probe deeper. They are often more interested in incarceration as a measure of employability and trustworthiness instead of its relation to any specific job. People who have felony records have a harder time finding a job. The psychological effects of incarceration can also impede an ex-felon's search for employment. Prison can cause social anxiety, distrust, and other psychological issues that negatively affect a person's reintegration into an employment setting. Men who are unemployed are more likely to participate in crime which leads to there being a 67% chance of a person with a previous felony conviction being charged again. In 2008, the difficulties males with a previous felony conviction in the United States had finding employment lead to approximately a 1.6% decrease in the employment rate alone. This is a loss of between $57 and $65 billion of output to the U.S. economy.

Although incarceration in general has a huge effect on employment, the effects become even more pronounced when looking at race. Devah Pager performed a study in 2003 and found that white males with no criminal record had a 34% chance of callback compared to 17% for white males with a criminal record. Black males with no criminal record were called back at a rate of 14%, while the rate dropped to 5% for those with a criminal record. Black men with no criminal background have a harder time finding employment than white men who have a history of criminal activity. While having a criminal record decreases the chance of a callback for white men by 50%, it decreases the callback chances for Black men by 64%.

While Pager's study is highly informative, it lacks some valuable information. Pager only studied white and Black men, which leaves out women and people of other races. It also fails to account for the shift from in-person to online job applications. A study conducted at Arizona State University in 2014 accounts for this missing information. This study was set up similarly to the Pager study, with the addition of female and Hispanic job applicants and online job applications. Men and women of white, Black, and Hispanic ethnicities account for 92% of the U.S. prison population.

The Arizona State University study also found that incarceration decreased employment opportunities. The findings indicated that having a criminal record reduced callbacks by approximately 50%. Hispanic women with a prison record fared most favorably in receiving a phone call back from potential employers, while African American women had modest results, and white women received the poorest results, having the lowest probability of receiving a phone call from a potential employer.

For men with a criminal record, white men fared most favorably, being 125% more likely to receive a call back from an employer than black men, and 18% more likely than Hispanic men. Males with a prison record were less likely than males without a prison record to receive a callback. However, the effects of incarceration on male applicants applying online were nearly nonexistent. In fact, the study found that "there was no effect of race/ethnicity, prison record, or community college [education] on men's success in advancing through the [online] hiring process". The Arizona State University study also produced results that contradicted Pager's.

Effects of other types of incarceration, such as shorter stays in local county jails, can also affect employment at both the individual and macro levels. At the community level, for example, jail incarceration has been found to diminish local labor markets, especially in areas with relatively high proportions of Black residents.

=== Environmental ===
Mass incarceration in the United States has created numerous environmental justice concerns, including both the environmental footprint of prisons and incarcerated individuals' exposure to environmental harm.

Prisons across the United States contribute to contamination of surrounding bodies of water. Prisons also contribute high amounts of air pollution which affects individuals incarcerated within the prison, surrounding communities, and the ecosystems in the surrounding area. Prisons around the country violate the Clean Water Act and Clean Air Act frequently. The Environmental Protection Agency is supposed to monitor prisons in the United States. However, prisons often fail to submit Environmental Impact Statements to the EPA each year, making it difficult to understand their environmental impact. Prisons also require a large amount of energy since they run 24 hours a day.

Many prisons around the United States are built on or close to superfund sites, which expose incarcerated individuals to environmental toxins such as high levels of lead and copper. Some prisons in the United States are also built next to landfills, toxic waste sites, and old mining sites. Since prisons are not strictly regulated, the existence of these prisons inherently validates toxins to be prevalent in the environment. Incarcerated individuals are forced to breathe and consume these toxins with no government protection.

Another concern that incarcerated individuals face is not having access to adequate heating and cooling during extreme weather conditions, which are only becoming more common due to climate change. As summers continue to get hotter, many prisons do not have air conditioning; numerous incarcerated individuals die from extreme heat as a result. Although prisons are supposed to provide fans and ice to individuals during extreme heat events, they do not always follow through. During the winter, prisons do not have proper heating. Many incarcerated individuals complain that the Department of Corrections does not provide supplies such as blankets during cold weather, and they have to depend on donations or suffer with nothing. Environmental justice and energy justice activists argue the lack of adequate heating and cooling in prisons is a form of "cruel and unusual punishment," which violates their Eighth Amendment.

There has been a growing movement to make prisons more sustainable through numerous "green prison" programs. Green prisons promote sustainable living while also focusing on the incarcerated individual's rehabilitation, which will hopefully lead to low recidivism rates. This includes reducing waste and transitioning to renewable energy sources. However, there has been some pushback to the spread of green programs within prisons as environmental justice activists argue they only reinforce mass incarceration.

== Criticism ==
Mass incarceration on a scale almost unexampled in human history is a fundamental fact of our country today—perhaps the fundamental fact, as slavery was the fundamental fact of 1850.

— Adam Gopnik

High rates of incarceration may be due to sentence length, which is further driven by many other factors. Shorter sentences may even diminish the criminal culture by possibly reducing re-arrest rates for first-time convicts. The U.S. Congress has ordered federal judges to make imprisonment decisions "recognizing that imprisonment is not an appropriate means of promoting correction and rehabilitation."

Critics have lambasted the United States for incarcerating a large number of non-violent and victimless offenders; half of all persons incarcerated under state jurisdiction are for non-violent offenses, and 20% are incarcerated for drug offenses (in state prisons; federal prison percentages are higher). "Human Rights Watch believes the extraordinary rate of incarceration in the United States wreaks havoc on individuals, families and communities, and saps the strength of the nation as a whole." The population of inmates housed in prisons and jails in the United States exceeds 2 million, with the per capita incarceration population higher than that officially reported by any other country. Criminal justice policy in the United States has also been criticized for many other reasons. In the 2014 book The Divide: American Injustice in the Age of the Wealth Gap, journalist Matt Taibbi argues that the expanding disparity of wealth and the increasing criminalization of those in poverty have culminated in the U.S. having the largest prison population "in the history of human civilization". The scholars Michael Meranze and Marie Gottschalk contend that the massive "carceral state" extends far beyond prisons, and distorts democracy, degrades society, obstructs meaningful discourse on criminal punishment and is an important barometer of the level of state and structural violence in a society. More recently, scholars have argued that a system of mass incarceration necessarily interferes with a free society "characterized by industry, discovery, and creation."

Some scholars have linked the ascent of neoliberal, free market ideology in the late 1970s to mass incarceration. Sociologist Loïc Wacquant argues that the "explosive growth" of the incarcerated poor can be seen as part of the "punitive regulation" of poverty in the neoliberal era to mitigate societal fallout from economic deregulation, welfare state retrenchment, increasing inequality and the imposition of workfare and underpaid, precarious employment on the marginalized urban "postindustrial proletariat". In this, he posits that the expansive prison system has become a core political institution, and that this "overgrown and intrusive penal state" is "deeply injurious to the ideals of democratic citizenship." Academic and activist Angela Davis argues that prisons in the U.S. have "become venues of profit as well as punishment;" as mass incarceration has increased, the prison system has become more about economic factors than criminality. Professor of Law at Columbia University Bernard Harcourt contends that neoliberalism holds the state as incompetent when it comes to economic regulation but proficient at policing and punishing, and that this paradox has resulted in the expansion of penal confinement. According to The Routledge Handbook of Poverty in the United States, "neoliberal social and economic policy has more deeply embedded the carceral state within the lives of the poor, transforming what it means to be poor in America." Historian Gary Gerstle reasons that while it may seem contradictory that the notions of market freedom and the establishment of a robust market economy occurred simultaneously with the reality of mass incarceration during the neoliberal period, neoliberals and even the classical economic liberals who preceded them "had long argued for the need to ringfence free markets, limiting participation to those who could handle its rigors." Only then could they operate "freely".

The sociologists John Clegg and Adaner Usmani assert that the high incarceration rates are partly the result of anemic social policy. As such, resolving the issue will necessitate significant redistribution coming from economic elites. They add that mass incarceration is "not a technical problem for which there are smart, straightforward, but just not-yet-realized solutions. Rather they argue, it is a political problem, the solution of which will require "confronting the entrenched power of the wealthy."

Another possible cause for this increase in incarceration since the 1970s could be the "war on drugs", which started around that time. Voters favored more elected prosecutors for promising to take harsher approaches than their opponents, such as locking up more people.

Our vast network of federal and state prisons, with some 2.3 million inmates, rivals the gulags of totalitarian states.

— Chris Hedges

Reporting at the annual meeting of the American Sociological Association (August 3, 2008), Becky Pettit, associate professor of sociology from the University of Washington and Bryan Sykes, a UW post-doctoral researcher, revealed that the increase in the United States's prison population since the 1970s is having profound demographic consequences that affect 1 in 50 Americans. Drawing data from a variety of sources that looked at prison and general populations, the researchers found that the boom in prison population is hiding lowered rates of fertility and increased rates of involuntary migration to rural areas and morbidity that is marked by a greater exposure to and risk of infectious diseases such as tuberculosis and HIV or AIDS.

Guilty plea bargains concluded 97% of all federal cases in 2011.

As of December 2012, two state prison systems, Alabama and South Carolina, segregated prisoners based on their HIV status. On December 21, U.S. District Court Judge Myron Thompson ruled in a lawsuit brought by the American Civil Liberties Union (ACLU) on behalf of several inmates that Alabama's practice violated federal disability law. He noted the state's "outdated and unsupported assumptions about HIV and the prison system's ability to deal with HIV-positive prisoners."

In 2022, the bipartisan Federal Prison Oversight Act was introduced, which would require the Department of Justice's Inspector General to conduct detailed inspections of each of the Bureau of Prisons' 122 facilities and would create an independent Justice Department position to investigate complaints. This was introduced shortly after corruption and abuse were discovered at a federal prison complex in Atlanta with the hopes that it would prevent such occurrences in the future.

=== Department of Justice "Smart on Crime" Program ===
On August 12, 2013, at the American Bar Association's House of Delegates meeting, Attorney General Eric Holder announced the "Smart on Crime" program, which is "a sweeping initiative by the Justice Department that in effect renounces several decades of tough-on-crime anti-drug legislation and policies." Holder said the program "will encourage U.S. attorneys to charge defendants only with crimes "for which the accompanying sentences are better suited to their individual conduct, rather than excessive prison terms more appropriate for violent criminals or drug kingpins…" Running through Holder's statements, the increasing economic burden of over-incarceration was stressed. As of August 2013, the Smart on Crime program is not a legislative initiative but an effort "limited to the DOJ's policy parameters".

In 2016, the Justice Department evaluated the efficacy of the policy changes that resulted from the "Smart on Crime" initiative. There was a decline in the federal inmate population of nearly 30,000 from 2013 to 2016. As state and local jurisdictions began implementing policies that mirrored those of the DOJ's "Smart" policies, incarceration rates across the country fell along with those at the federal level reflecting an overall reduction of 8.4%.

=== Strip searches and cavity searches ===
The procedural use of strip searches and cavity searches in the prison system has raised human rights concerns.

== References in popular culture ==
In popular culture, mass incarceration has become a prominent issue in the hip-hop community. Artists like Tupac Shakur, NWA, LL Cool J, and Kendrick Lamar have written songs and poems that condemn racial disparities in the criminal justice system, specifically the alleged practice of police officers targeting African Americans. By presenting the negative implications of mass incarceration in a way that permeates popular culture, rap music is more likely to impact younger generations than a book or scholarly article would. Hip hop accounts of mass incarceration are based on victim-based testimony and are effective in inspiring others to speak out against the corrupt criminal justice system. The soul singer Raphael Saadiq's 2019 album, Jimmy Lee, thematizes racial disparities in mass incarceration as well as other societal and family issues affecting African Americans.

In addition to references in popular music, mass incarceration has also played a role in modern film. For example, Ava DuVernay's Netflix film 13th, released in 2017, criticizes mass incarceration and compares it to the history of slavery throughout the United States, beginning with the provision of the 13th Amendment that allows for involuntary servitude "as a punishment for crime whereof the party shall have been duly convicted". The film equates mass incarceration with the post-Civil War Jim Crow Era.

The fight against mass incarceration has also been part of the broader discourse of the 21st-century movement for Black lives. #BlackLivesMatter, a progressive movement created by Alicia Garza after the death of Trayvon Martin, was designed as an online platform to fight against anti-Black sentiments such as mass incarceration, police brutality, and ingrained racism within modern society. According to Garza, "Black Lives Matter is an ideological and political intervention in a world where Black lives are systematically and intentionally targeted for demise. It is an affirmation of Black folks' contributions to this society, our humanity, and our resilience in the face of deadly oppression." This movement has focused on specific racial issues faced by African Americans in the justice system, including police brutality, ending capital punishment, and eliminating "the criminalization and dehumanization of Black youth across all areas of society."

== Federal prisons ==
The Federal Bureau of Prisons, a division of the United States Department of Justice, is responsible for the administration of United States federal prisons. The United States Sentencing Commission reported in September of 2025 that 154,932 inmates were being housed within federal prisons at that time.

== State prisons ==
Imprisonment in state judicial systems declined steadily from 2006 to 2012, from 689,536 annually to 553,843 annually.

== Military prisons ==
Across the world, the U.S. military operates several detention facilities. At year-end 2021, a total of 1,131 prisoners were held under military jurisdiction.

== See also ==
- Capital punishment in the United States
- Death in custody
- Decarceration in the United States
- Equal Justice Initiative
- History of United States Prison Systems
- Religion in United States prisons
- Prison gangs in the United States
- Prisoner rights in the United States
- Prisoner suicide
- Prisoner abuse
- Social groups in male and female prisons in the United States
- United States incarceration rate

=== Administration ===
- Federal Prison Industries, Inc.
- Inmate telephone system

=== Conditions of confinement ===
- Prison Legal News

Controversies

- Kids for cash scandal

Prison advocacy groups

- November Coalition
- Prison Policy Initiative

Related

- Books to Prisoners
- Parole in the United States
- Crime in the United States
- Law enforcement in the United States
- Penal labor in the United States
- Penal populism
- Civilian noninstitutional population
- Felony disenfranchisement in the United States
- Human rights in the United States § Prison system
- Race in the United States criminal justice system
- Race and the war on drugs
- Racial profiling in the United States

By state

- Prisons in California
- Incarceration in Florida
