= Valerie Jenness =

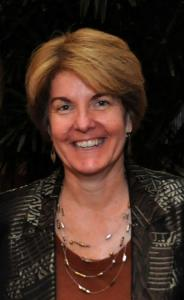
- Professor Valerie Jenness
- Born: March 7, 1963 (age 63)
- Education: University of California, Santa Barbara (Ph.D.); University of California, Santa Barbara (M.A.); Central Washington University (B.S.)
- Occupations: Professor, Author, Researcher
- Employer: University of California
- Notable work: "Appealing to Justice” “Making Hate a Crime” “Hate Crimes" “Making it Work“ "Routing the Opposition"
- Awards: Excellence in Undergraduate Education Award; President’s Award, Article Award; Public Understanding of Sociology Award; Joseph B. Gittler Award; Chancellor’s Award for Excellence in Fostering Undergraduate Research

Valerie Jenness (born March 7, 1963) is an author, researcher, public policy advisor, and professor in the Department of Criminology, Law and Society and in the Department of Sociology at the University of California, Irvine (UCI). Jenness is currently a visiting professor in the Department of Sociology at the University of California, Santa Barbara (UCSB) and prior to that, was a senior visiting scholar at the Institute for Research on Women and Gender at the University of Michigan. Jenness served as dean of the School of Social Ecology from 2009 to 2015 and chair of the Department of Criminology, Law and Society from 2001-2006. Jenness is credited with conducting the first systemic study of transgender women in men's prisons.

== Academic life ==
In 1991, Jenness received her doctoral degree from UCSB and began teaching as an assistant professor at Washington State University from 1991-1997. During that time, she served the Department of Sociology, the Criminal Justice Program and the American Studies Program. In 1997, Jenness when she began teaching as an assistant professor in women's studies at UCI. While serving as dean, Jenness has continued to teach both undergraduate and graduate courses. She has received multiple teaching awards as well as other forms of recognition for her contributions to teaching.

Jenness’ research primarily focuses on the links between deviance and social control (especially law); the politics of crime control and criminalization; social movements and social change; and the public policy surrounding the corrections system. Courses taught by Jenness include: Introduction to Criminology, Law and Society, Hate Crimes, Deviance and Violence Against Sexual and Gender Minorities. Drawing on multiple theoretical perspectives, from social constructionism to new institutionalism, she has employed a variety of quantitate and qualitative research methods to contribute to our understandings of crime response.

== Contributions to public policy ==
Early in her career (1999), Jenness gave a press conference at the American Sociological Association (ASA) meetings in Chicago with two other researchers. In this presentation, she summarized the current state of social science knowledge on the subject of hate crime and hate crime law for the national media. Later that year, Jenness appeared before members and staff of the United States Congress to deliver a presentation at the United States Congressional Briefing and Seminar on "Hate Crime in America." The presentation was subsequently published in Hate Crime in America: What Do We Know? by the ASA as part of the Issue Series in Social Research and Social Policy.

Jenness has used her research and findings to not only publish studies, but develop innovative educational materials for public policy officials. Her contributions have been recognized by the California Department of Corrections and Rehabilitation (CDCR), the Los Angeles Police Department and the United States Department of Homeland Security. Many agencies have referred to Jenness’ research in the forming of their own policy, including the United States Congress and the National Academy of Sciences.

Jenness also provided analysis and advice on bills in the California State Senate sponsored by then Senators Deborah Ortiz, Tom Hayden and Sheila Kuehl. In 2004, Jenness provided an assessment of The Omnibus Hate Crime Bill of 2004 (California Senate Bill 1234) to the legislative staff on the California State Senate Committee on Public Safety. The bill was designed to overhaul California's hate crime laws. In September 2004, the bill was enacted into law by Governor Schwarzenegger.

Shortly after her work on the Omnibus Hate Crime Bill, Jenness served as a consultant to the California Commission on Peace Officer Standards and Training (POST). Her task was working with law enforcement officials to redesign curriculum and produce instructional videos for training police officers. Presently, these videos are part of the official police training curriculum in the State of California.

During Governor Schwarzenegger's term, Jenness was appointed to the Rehabilitation Strike Team to facilitate the implementation of California Assembly Bill 900, also known as the Public Safety and Offender Rehabilitation Services Act of 2007. This Strike Team was charged with working collaboratively with the CDCR to implement a set of sweeping reforms designed to improve rehabilitation services, grow entry opportunities and reduce prison overcrowding in California.

== Research funding ==
- National Academy of Sciences
- National Science Foundation
- National Institute of Justice
- California Policy Research Center
- California Department of Mental Health
- California Department of Corrections and Rehabilitation
- University of California
- Washington State University

== Awards and recognition ==
- 2019 "Doris Wilkinson Faculty Leadership Award" from the Society for the Study of Social Problems
- 2014-2015 "President’s Award" from the Western Society of Criminology
- 2014 "Excellence in Undergraduate Education Award" from University of California, Irvine
- 2013 "Article Award" from the Law and Society Association
- 2010 "Public Understanding of Sociology Award" from the American Sociological Association
- 2008 "Joseph B. Gittler Award" from the Society for the Study of Social Problems
- 2006 "Chancellor’s Award for Excellence in Fostering Undergraduate Research” from University of California, Irvine
- “Most Inspirational Instructor” from Washington State University
- American Society of Criminology
- Gustavus Myers Center for the Study of Bigotry and Human Rights in North America

Other less notable recognitions from the University of California include: “Professor of the Month,” “Interesting Professor We Would Like to Meet Outside the Classroom” and “UCI faculty member who has had the greatest impact on a student’s education.”

== Publications ==
Jenness has authored and co-authored five books, including:

- “Appealing to Justice: Prisoner Grievances, Rights, and Carceral Logic” (ISBN 978-0520284173). University of California: 2014.
- “Making Hate a Crime: From Social Movement to Law Enforcement Practice” (ISBN 978-0871544100). Russell Sage Foundation: 2004.
- “Hate Crimes: New Social Movements and the Politics of Violence” (ISBN 978-0202306025). Aldine Transaction: 1997
- “Making it Work: The Prostitutes' Rights Movement in Perspective” (ISBN 978-0202304649) Aldine Transaction: 1993
- “Routing the Opposition: Social Movements, Public Policy, and Democracy” (ISBN 978-0816644803) University of Minnesota Press: 2005

== Selected published works ==
- Sexton, Lori and Valerie Jenness. In Press. "'We're Like Community': The Social Allocation of Collective Identity and Collective Identity Among Transgender Women in Prisons for Men." Punishment & Society.
- Jenness, Valerie and Sarah Fenstermaker. 2016. "Forty Years After Brownmiller: Prisons for Men, Transgender Inmates, and the Rape of the Feminine." Gender & Society 30(1):14-29.
- Calavita, Kitty and Valerie Jenness. 2015. Appealing to Justice: Prisoner Grievances, Rights, and Carceral Logic. Berkeley, California: University of California Press.
- Jenness, Valerie and Sarah Fenstermaker. 2014. "Agnes Goes to Prison: Gender Authenticity, Transgender Inmates in Prisons for Men, and the Pursuit of 'The Real Deal'". Gender & Society 28(1)1:5-31.
- Jenness, Valerie. 2014. "Pesticides, Prisoners, and Policy: Complexity and Praxis in Resesarch on Transgender Prisoners and Beyond". Sociological Perspectives 57(1):6-26.
- Calavita, Kitty and Valerie Jenness. 2013. "Inside the Pyramid of Disputes: Naming Problems and Filing Grievances in California Prisons." Social Problems 60(1):50-80.
- Jenness, Valerie and Ryken Grattet. 2012. "Hate Crime Law, Policy, and Law Enforcement in California: The Presence, Content, and Consequences of the Law-in-Between." A special issue of Poinikii Dikaiosini (Penal Justice) devoted to Eglimatologia (Criminology). Athens, Greece: Nomiki Vivliothiki (Legal Library).
- Jenness, Valerie and Michael Smyth. 2011. “The Passage and Implementation of the Prison Rape Elimination Act: Legal Endogeneity and the Uncertain Road from Symbolic Law to Instrumental Effects. Stanford Law & Policy Review 22(2): 489-528.
- Jenness, Valerie. 2011. "Getting to Know 'The Girls' in an 'Alpha-Male' Community: Notes on Fieldwork on Transgender Inmates in California Prisons." In Sociologists Backstage: Answers to 10 Questions About What They Do, edited by Sarah Fenstermaker and Nikki Jones. New York: Routledge Press.
- Jenness, Valerie. 2010. "From Policy to Prisoners to People: A 'Soft-Mixed Methods' Approach to Studying Transgender Prisoners." Journal of Contemporary Ethnography. 39(5): 517-553.
- Sexton, Lori A., Valerie Jenness, and Jennifer Macy Sumner. 2010. "Where the Margins Meet: A Demographic Assessment of Transgender Inmates in Men's Prisons." Justice Quarterly.27(6):835-860.
- Jenness, Valerie, Cheryl L. Maxson, Jennifer Macy Sumner, and Kristy N. Matsuda. 2010. "Accomplishing the Difficult, But Not Impossible: Collecting Self-Report Data on Inmate-on-Inmate Sexual Assault in Prison." Criminal Justice Policy Review 21(1):3-30.
- Jenness, Valerie. 2009. "From Symbolic Law to Criminal Justice Practice: Hate Crime Policy, Policing, and Prosecution." In Handbook on Crime and Public Policy, edited by Michael Tonry. New York: Oxford University Press.
- Grattet, Ryken and Valerie Jenness. 2008. "Transforming Symbolic Law into Organizational Action: Hate Crime Policy and Law Enforcement Practice." Social Forces 87(1):501-528.
- Jenness, Valerie. 2008. "Pluto, Prisons, and Plaintiffs: Notes on Systematic Back Translation from an Embedded Researcher.'" Social Problems 55:1-22.
- Jenness, Valerie. 2007. "The Emergence, Content, and Institutionalization of Hate Crime Law: How a Diverse Policy Community a Produced a Modern Legal Fact." Annual Review of Law and Social Science 3:141-160.
- Grattet, Ryken and Valerie Jenness. 2005. "The Reconstitution of Law in Local Settings: Agency Discretion, Ambiguity, and a Surplus of Law in the Policing of Hate Crime." Law & Society Review 39:893-941.
- Jenness, Valerie and Ryken Grattet. 2005. "The Law-In-Between: The Effects of Organizational Perviousness on the Policing of Hate Crime." Social Problems 52:337-359.
- Jenness, Valerie. 2004. "Explaining Criminalization: From Demography and Status Politics to Globalization and Modernization." Annual Review of Sociology 30:141-171
