= Social groups in male and female prisons in the United States =

Social groups in male and female prisons in the United States differ in the social structures and cultural norms observed in men's and women's prison populations. While there are many underlying similarities between the two sets of populations, sociologists have historically noted different formal and informal social structures within inmate populations.

One of the most common and prominently noted differences is the appearance in women's prisons of pseudo-families, which, while they have been discussed in sociological texts since the 1930s, have not been noted in men's prisons at any point. This difference is a manifestation of gendered social factors which influence male and female populations within prisons and within larger society.

== Population differences ==
The populations and demographics of male and female inmate populations in the US are very different from one another. These differences factor heavily into theories on prisoner social organization. The most significant difference is in the relative size of male and female populations; in 2014 there were approximately 1,440,000 male and 112,000 female prisoners in the United States. The much larger size of the male prison population causes major differences in the institutions in which male and female inmates serve their time. Another significant factor in prisoner social structure is the differences in arrest factors for male and female prison populations; higher proportion of female inmates are incarcerated due to a property or drug charge than are their male counterparts, a higher proportion of whom have been arrested for a violent offence.

Female inmates are more likely to have been the sole provider for their children prior to their incarceration: 46% of fathers in prison self-reported to have been living with their children prior to arrest; this number was 64% for mothers. Additionally, because there are fewer women's prisons, incarcerated mothers tend to receive fewer visits from family than incarcerated fathers typically do as they are often living in a facility which is hundreds of miles from where their children are living.

Incarcerated women tend to have significantly higher rates of mental health problems than male prisoners; 73% of women in state prisons suffer from some mental health issue versus 55% of men.

== Inmate social groups and culture ==
The societies and cultures within prisons frequently have been of interest to sociologists; one early study, published in 1949, noted the significance of prison community and the structure of the inmates' society. The author, F.E. Haynes, found that the male inmates tended to form hierarchical social groups based on perceived characteristics and abilities.

Life in prison involves many hardships and deprivations, and prisoners often alleviate these through interpersonal relationships. There is a continuing scholarly debate over the nature of prisoner subculture: while some sociologists argue that society and culture within prisons are unique, created primarily or exclusively by the circumstances of imprisonment, others hold that these societies are determined by wider cultural influences. In the latter view, the presence of inmate culture can be caused by discomforts of imprisonment, but the form and structure of inmate social groups is definitively determined by cultural norms and expectations from culture external to prison life. One major piece of evidence used to support this argument is the structural differences of male and female inmate society.

There are also debates over the nature and cause of prisoner social groups. One theory is that social groups are formed to reduce the discomforts of incarceration, and are therefore directly caused by the nature of imprisonment, while others believe that personal experience and the structure of each particular institution have more impact on inmate social structure. Additionally, some scholars believe that social groups form differently in male and female populations, while others hold that groups are fundamentally the same in men's and women's prisons.

=== Differences between male and female inmate culture ===
Charles Tittle conducted a study of inmate social groups in a Federal hospital serving a large groups of prisoners suffering from narcotics addiction in 1969, in which he compared the experiences of female inmates to those of the males. He found that women were significantly more likely to identify as having a close group of friends; 70% of female respondents said that they had one to five good friends, as compared to 49% of males. Tittle conjectures that these findings indicate that under comparable circumstances, women are more likely to form 'primary group affiliations' while men are more likely to integrate into the overall social organization. He states that male inmate social groups tend to be more symbiotic and to place higher value on individualism than female inmate groups were observed to do.

=== Gangs as social organizers in prison ===
More recent studies have focused on trends which are caused by the rapid increase in prison population since the 1970s, such as the prominence of prison gangs. In his literature review and analysis of evidence about gangs in the California correctional complex, David Sharbek found that gangs formed as a response to a lack of protection from prison officials. According to his research, male prison populations rely on non-structured social norms and on formalized organizations to govern themselves. Social norms become less powerful as a structuring mechanism as populations grow, as they become more difficult to enforce, and as more new members who do not follow these norms enter the society. These new developments mean that social organizations, which have clear membership and enforcement measures, must be more heavily relied upon to govern the inmate society. These organizations typically take the form of prison gangs, which are initially formed to provide protection to their members, as these members can no longer rely on norms or correctional officials to do the same.

=== Homosocial and homosexual activity ===
While homosexual contact is common in both male and female prisoners, female inmates tend to emphasize an emotional connection, sometimes displaying affection without any intention of sexual contact; male inmates tend not to display any affection despite frequent sexual interaction. This phenomenon is caused partially by the extreme stigmatization of homosexuality in male prison populations. Prison conditions encourage young male inmates to emphasize their masculinity, causing participants in homosexual relationships typically to explain their actions as purely physical to avoid homophobic bias against themselves. In the 1960s, Tittle observed that female inmates engaging in homosexual activity were more than five times more likely to describe their relationships as emotionally, rather than physically, based.

== Pseudo-families ==
Pseudo-families, also known as familial networks, are social groups of approximately 15 to 20 inmates formed in women's prisons which have been regularly observed by many anthropological and sociological researchers since the 1930s. Within the pseudo-family, inmates take on roles which parallel standard family roles, including parents, children, and siblings, as well as extended family such as aunt, uncle, or grandparent. Family roles tend to be delineated by the age of participants, and to be gendered such that some inmates take on masculine roles and hetero normative male characteristics. These networks are often based around homosexual couples as the parents of the family. Sexual relationships between inmates are a significant aspect of pseudo-families, though the majority of relationships in an extended pseudo-family are platonic. Families and family members have been observed to interact with one another following regular kinship patterns in order to form larger social systems, as Giallombardo noted in her 1966 study.

=== History and theories ===
Early studies of pseudo-families focused on the homosexual couples within the families rather than on the family groups themselves, though the women within them stated that sexual gratification was not their main reason for entering and maintaining a pseudo-family. While conventional interpretations of this practice has seen it as significantly different from gang grouping in male prisoners, some researchers are challenging this interpretation as a misreading of gang groupings in women's prisons based on gender bias.

Though it is still popular in the public opinion, the phenomenon has gradually become less widely studied by sociologists since the 1970s. According to some researchers, this is due to a decrease in pseudo-family relationships in women's prisons, others have simply focused on women inmates' social groups in other ways as they believe the pseudo-family is not a distinct social phenomenon.

=== Functions ===
Pseudo-families provide members with emotional and financial support, companionship, and protection from other inmates. One study of over 200 inmates in two Texan prisons found that 50% of participants in pseudo-families considered the feeling of companionship and comfort to be the most significant aspects of family membership. This study also found that members of families had significantly higher rates of participation in fights and disciplinary action than did non-members, though many respondents noted that guards were more likely to harass members and the researchers found a high degree of bias against pseudo-family and homosexual relationships among the correctional staff.

The presence of pseudo families fits into the overall model of the experience of women in prison as more reliant on other inmates than males typically admit to being. While they frequently state in interviews that they prefer to handle their emotional life by themselves, most female inmates practice interpersonal techniques to relieve stress and moderate their emotional experience. This tendency was noted by Kimberly Greer in her study of the inmates of a Midwestern women's prison. Greer conducted in-depth interviews with 35 inmates in 1997, focusing on relationships and emotional management. She describes the explanations women give for attempting to ignore or deny strong emotional feeling or pain, which include past victimization and distrust of other inmates, as well as women's reactions to and coping mechanisms for unwanted emotion, which included spiritual experiences, distraction from the emotion, and humor. Ultimately, she finds that women prefer to self-regulate their emotional states, and primarily only share emotions with select, close friends.

=== Explanations ===
Sociologists seeking to understand the presence of pseudo-families in women's prisons have suggested a wide variety of causes, and this subject has therefore been somewhat controversial.

Rose Giallombardo, one of the first sociologists to perform a detailed study of subculture in women's prisons, suggested that the pseudo-family develops as part of female inmates' responses to the practical and emotional difficulties of imprisonment. She explained their presence in women's prisons in the 1960s as an extension of internalized gender roles and expectations. Paralleling male and female inmate social structures, she suggests that notable differences in these cultural systems were due almost entirely to broader cultural definitions. Gendered perceptions in these and in other writings and prisons are dependent on contemporary society's gender roles. Additionally, Giallombardo suggests that kinship networks of pseudo-families display the inmates attempts to replicate their social worlds outside the prison through their familial relationships.

Another explanation often cited is that the family networks were induced by the cottage style institutions traditionally favored for women's prisons, which naturally created familial environments for inmates. A more gendered theory which has lost prominence contended that women were likely to be more distressed than their male counterparts at being separated from their children and families, and would therefore re-create the families they were missing by creating new social groups with other inmates. This theory is predicated on the belief that female inmates were significantly more likely to be close with their children and other family members than males would be.

=== Challenges to the pseudo-family model ===
Though it is popular among sociologists, many recent scholars have argued that the pseudo-family model is not an accurate assessment of the social phenomenon, many claiming that female pseudo families were synonymous with gangs in male prisons as they served exactly the same social organizational purpose.

One study, "Reconsidering the Pseudo-Family/Gang Gender Distinction in Prison Research", examined the discourse used by female inmates to discuss their experiences with social groups, and found little distinction between male and female social groups within prisons. For this study, Craig Forsyth and Rhonda Evans collected data from 24 female inmates of the Louisiana Correctional Institute for Women in the form of interviews and journals in which the women recorded their relevant perceptions. Noting both the terminology used to describe and the functions of the pseudo families, the authors found that, rather than presenting as a unique phenomenon, pseudo families served the same purposes as did male inmates' social groups. They further contend that the distinctions made by researchers are caused by "stereotypical depictions of gender roles" (Forsyth, Evans, 2003, p. 15) rather than by actual differences in the experiences of the inmates, male or female.

Other sociologists have suggested that women's interpersonal relationships in prison have altered, so that the pseudo family has lost prominence. Katherine Greer conducted a series of in depth interviews of 35 inmates of a Midwestern women's prison in 1997 and found that interpersonal relationships between inmates were characterized by distrust and perceptions of dishonesty. Most women in these interviews described a fear of the dependency a close relationship causes, exacerbated by the transitory conditions inherent to prison relationships, and therefore believed that social isolation was their safest option. Greer also points out the general acceptance of homosexual relationships among the inmates, though few respondents indicated that they had participated in one while in prison, which Greer notes as an apparent leave from the practice of women in previous decades. Additionally, these relationships were generally characterized as being formed for economic manipulation rather than for mutual affection. While some of her interviewees did mention that they used familial monikers such as 'Mom' and 'Grandmother' for certain elderly inmates, Greer found no evidence that these names reflected any structured familial roles between inmates. These changes were explained in part by the changing structure of women's imprisonment in America; the drastic growth of prisoner population combined with changing attitudes and neo-liberal rhetoric could be discouraging factors in inmates' interpersonal trust. Additionally, as gendered societal roles are considered a partial explanation for pseudo-families, Greer suggests that changing gender roles might also hinder family development in prisons. Finally, modern technology has allowed male and female inmates to remain in much closer contact with significant others they were able to in the past, reducing social isolation and therefore the need to seek close pseudo-family relationships.

== Correction officer perceptions ==
The differences in male and female prison populations and social structure impact the correctional officers of the institutions as well as the inmates. Officers' views on certain emotional or sexual relationships, for instance, can cause them to treat members of pseudo-families in woman's prisons differently than they do the general population.

Correction officers generally prefer to work in men's prisons, this tendency is closely linked with gendered perceptions of male and female inmates. Additionally, officers often subscribe to idea that working in a men's prison is 'real work' whereas women's prisons allow for less enforcement and less serious work. Prison guards tend to view female inmates as more emotional and therefore more difficult to manage than their male counterparts; in her 1987 book studying correctional officers who have supervised both male and female prisoners, Joycelyn Pollock suggests that these opinions are caused by preconceived gendered views of the inmates.

In 1993 Dana Britton conducted a study of correctional officer views and experiences through a series of semi-structured interviews on career path, training, issues concerning gender, and future work plans with officers from a men's and a women's prison in the American Southwest. She found that officers consistently expressed a preference to work in men's prisons, citing differences between male and female inmates as the main cause; officers perceive female inmates to be more difficult to manage, more likely to question an instruction, and less respectful than males. Many respondents also characterized female inmates as more emotional and therefore more likely to become inexplicably violent, while male violence is rationalized as having understandable goals. In this way, female violence is seen as irrational and ineffective whereas male violence is seen as meaningful and understandable. Britton notes that these perceptions seemed to be based primarily on essentialized views of women. Officers also tended to inherently consider men's prisons as the general model, the real prisons, while they viewed women's prisons as abnormal and deficient.
