= List of Georgia Department of Corrections facilities =

The Georgia Department of Corrections operates prisons, transitional centers, probation detention centers, and substance use disorder treatment facilities. In addition, state inmates are also housed at private and county correctional facilities.

Georgia Prisons — green=state, red=federal (Hover mouse over pog to popup clickable link)

== State prisons ==
Name	Location	Security level	Capacity	Type(s) of offenders
Arrendale State Prison	Alto	Special mission	1490	Adult & juvenile females
Augusta State Medical Prison	Grovetown	Close, special mission	1326	Adult males
Baldwin State Prison	Hardwick	Close	981	Adult males
Burruss Correctional Training Center	Forsyth	Medium	708	Adult & juvenile males
Calhoun State Prison	Morgan	Medium	1639	Adult males
Central State Prison	Macon	Medium	1153	Adult males
Coastal State Prison	Garden City	Medium	1389	Adult males
Dodge State Prison	Chester	Medium	1236	Adult males
Dooly State Prison	Unadilla	Medium	1702	Adult males
Emanuel Women's Facility	Swainsboro	Medium	415	Adult females
Georgia Diagnostic and Classification State Prison	Jackson	Special mission	2487	Adult males
Hancock State Prison	Sparta	Close	1201	Adult males
Hays State Prison	Trion	Close	1100	Adult males
Helms Facility	Atlanta	Special mission	67	Adult males & adult females
Jimmy Autry State Prison	Pelham	Medium	1712	Adult males
Johnson State Prison	Wrightsville	Medium	1612	Adult males
Lee State Prison	Leesburg	Medium	762	Adult males
Long Unit	Ludowici	Medium	212	Adult males
Macon State Prison	Oglethorpe	Close	1762	Adult males
Montgomery State Prison	Mount Vernon	Medium	418	Adult males
Phillips State Prison	Buford	Close	925	Adult males
Pulaski State Prison	Hawkinsville	Medium	1211	Adult females
Rogers State Prison	Reidsville	Medium	1391	Adult males
Rutledge State Prison	Columbus	Medium	640	Adult males
Smith State Prison	Glennville	Close	1570	Adult males
S.M.U. Special Management Unit at Georgia Diagnostic and Classification State Prison	Jackson	Special management unit	192	Adult males
Telfair State Prison	Helena	Close	1410	Adult males
Valdosta State Prison & Annex	Valdosta	Close	1184	Adult males
Walker State Prison	Rock Spring	Medium	444	Adult males
Ware State Prison	Waycross	Close	1492	Adult males
Washington State Prison	Davisboro	Medium	1346	Adult males
Whitworth Women's Facility	Hartwell	Medium	442	Adult females
Wilcox State Prison	Abbeville	Medium	1840	Adult males

== Transitional centers ==
Name	Location	Security level	Capacity	Type(s) of offenders
Arrendale Transitional Center	Alto	Minimum	112	Adult females
Atlanta Transitional Center	Atlanta	Minimum	277	Adult males
Augusta Transitional Center	Augusta	Minimum	230	Adult males
Bacon Transitional Center	Alma	Minimum	284	Adult males
Charles D. Hudson Transitional Center	LaGrange	Minimum	157	Adult males
Clayton Transitional Center	Forest Park	Minimum	379	Adult males
Columbus Transitional Center	Columbus	Minimum	140	Adult males
Macon Transitional Center	Macon	Minimum	156	Adult males
Metro Transitional Center	Atlanta	Minimum	234	Adult females
Phillips Transitional Center	Buford	Minimum	197	Adult males
Smith Transitional Center	Claxton	Minimum	213	Adult males
Valdosta Transitional Center	Valdosta	Minimum	164	Adult males

== Reentry facilities ==
Name	Location	Security level	Capacity	Type(s) of offenders
Metro Reentry Facility	Atlanta	Medium	355	Adult males, adult females (1992–2011)

== Probation facilities ==
Name	Location	Capacity	Type(s) of offenders
Bainbridge Probation Substance Abuse Treatment Center	Bainbridge	392	Adult males
Bleckley Residential Substance Abuse Treatment Center	Cochran	208	Adult females
Colwell Probation Detention Center	Blairsville	271	Adult males
Emanuel Probation Detention Center	Twin City	369	Adult males
McEver Probation Detention Center	Perry	235	Adult males
Patten Probation Detention Center	Lakeland	252	Adult males
Paulding Probation Detention Center	Dallas	244	Adult males
Treutlen Probation Detention Center	Soperton	295	Adult males
Women's Probation Detention Center	Claxton	236	Adult females

== Substance use disorder facilities ==
Name	Location	Capacity	Type(s) of offenders
Appling Integrated Treatment Facility	Baxley	206	Adult males
Northwest Residential Substance Abuse Treatment Center	Rock Spring	200	Adult males
Turner Residential Substance Abuse Treatment Center	Sycamore	204	Adult males
West Central Integrated Treatment Facility	Zebulon	171	Adult females

== Private facilities ==
Name	Location	Security level	Capacity	Type(s) of offenders
Coffee Correctional Facility	Nicholls	Medium	2628	Adult males
Jenkins Correctional Facility	Millen	Medium	1150	Adult males
Riverbend Correctional Facility	Milledgeville	Medium	1500	Adult males
Wheeler Correctional Facility	Alamo	Medium	2695	Adult males

== County facilities ==
Name	Location	Security level	Capacity	Type(s) of offenders
Athens-Clarke County Correctional Institution	Athens	Medium	112	Adult males
Bulloch County Correctional Institution	Statesboro	Medium	160	Adult males
Carroll County Correctional Institute	Carrollton	Medium	246	Adult males
Clayton County Prison	Lovejoy	Medium	242	Adult males
Colquitt County Prison	Moultrie	Medium	190	Adult males
Coweta County Prison	Newnan	Medium	232	Adult males
Decatur County Prison	Bainbridge	Minimum	135	Adult males
Effingham County Prison	Springfield	Medium	192	Adult males
Floyd County Prison	Rome	Medium	424	Adult males
Gwinnett County Prison	Lawrenceville	Minimum	158	Adult males
Hall County Correctional Institution	Gainesville	Medium	200	Adult males
Harris County Prison	Hamilton	Medium	150	Adult males
Jackson County Correctional Institution	Jefferson	Medium	150	Adult males
Jefferson County Correctional Institute	Louisville	Medium	140	Adult males
Mitchell County Correctional Institute	Camilla	Medium	135	Adult males
Muscogee County Prison	Columbus	Medium	576	Adult males
Richmond County Correctional Institution	Augusta	Medium	230	Adult males
Screven County Prison	Sylvania	Medium	148	Adult males
Spalding County Correctional Institution	Griffin	Medium	384	Adult males
Sumter County Correctional Institute	Americus	Medium	350	Adult males
Terrell County Correctional Institute	Dawson	Medium	140	Adult males

== Closed facilities (partial list) ==
Name	Year closed
Bostick State Prison	2010
Georgia State Prison	2022
Homerville State Prison	2009
Men's State Prison	2011
Metro State Prison	2011
Milan State Prison	2008
Rivers State Prison	2008
Scott State Prison	2009
Thomas County Prison	2017
Troup County Correctional Institution	2017
Wayne State Prison	2008

== Notes ==
- Listed are the physical capacities, not the operational capacities. Because facilities may house a greater number of offenders than their established operational capacities, and because operational capacities are much more likely to change than vice versa, physical capacities may be more useful numbers for comparison purposes.
- The Georgia Department of Corrections only houses juveniles sentenced as adults. All others are housed in facilities operated by the Georgia Department of Juvenile Justice.

== Works cited ==
- "Corrections Division Facilities Directory" (PDF). Georgia Dept. of Corrections. September 16, 2020. Archived from the original (PDF) on February 26, 2021.
