= Death of Nikki Whitehead =

2010 murder in Conyers, Georgia, US

Jarmecca Yvonne "Nikki" Whitehead (April 18, 1975 – January 13, 2010) was a 34-year-old beautician and mother of 16-year-old identical twins Jasmiyah Kaneesha and Tasmiyah Janeesha Whitehead. On the afternoon of January 13, 2010, she was found dead in the bathroom of her home in the gated subdivision Bridle Ridge Walk, located in Conyers, Georgia. Whitehead had been beaten with a pot and stabbed repeatedly. Her daughters were arrested four months after the slaying on May 21, 2010, and charged with murder. Both initially pleaded not guilty. In a plea agreement, each twin pleaded guilty to the lesser charge of voluntary manslaughter in 2014. They were sentenced to serve 30 years in prison with the possibility of parole.

== History ==
In 2000, 25-year-old Whitehead met 55-year-old truck driver Robert Head. It was not long before she and the girls moved in with Head in the city of Conyers, Georgia.

Tasmiyah and Jasmiyah were both honor roll students and Girl Scouts. The girls were initially raised by their great-grandmother, Della Frazier. Frazier said that Whitehead was a sporadic and random presence in her children's lives. In 2007, when the twins were 13, Whitehead requested custody of them. Whitehead and the twins clashed. Frazier said that the twins saw their mother's attempts to control them as hypocritical. The conflicts escalated to physical altercations and resulted in counseling and juvenile court appearances. Frazier was given custody again, only to have Whitehead regain custody on January 5, 2010. The girls protested the decision, but the court ordered them and their mother to live together for a two-week trial period. Whitehead was killed on January 13, 2010. The twins said that they discovered their mother dead. The medical examiner called the killing a crime of passion and not likely to have been performed by a stranger. Whitehead's boyfriend was cleared after DNA testing. Evidence, including bite marks attributed to wounds inflicted by their mother during the fight, implicated the twins, and they were charged in May 2010. Both initially pleaded not guilty.

== Convictions ==
In January 2014, Tasmiyah pleaded guilty to voluntary manslaughter and other charges and was sentenced to 30 years in prison with the possibility of parole. On February 7, 2014, one month after her twin, Jasmiyah pleaded guilty to the same charges and is serving the same sentence. The twins were incarcerated at separate prisons within the Georgia Department of Corrections with Tasmiyah completing her sentence in Pulaski State Prison and, as of September 2026, Jasmiyah serving her sentence in the Metro Transitional Center, a minimum-security community residential facility that helps carefully screened inmates prepare for release back into society including through employment, education, and counseling. Although most states allow inmates to earn GEDs, Georgia is one of the few states that enable its inmates to graduate high school. In 2015, Jasmiyah graduated high school and was the class valedictorian. With over three years in jail before sentencing, the sisters were eligible for parole in 2017. Tasmiyah was released from prison on August 5, 2026, and is on parole. As of September 2026, Jasmiyah had a Tentative Parole Month of March 2028.

== See also ==
- Matricide
