= Alvin and Judith Neelley =

American criminal couple

Alvin Neelley
- Born: Alvin Howard Neelley, Jr. July 15, 1953; Trion, Georgia, U.S.
- Died: October 21, 2005 (aged 52); Milledgeville, Georgia, U.S.
- Years active: 1982
- Spouse: Judith Neelley (m. 1980)
- Children: 3
- Convictions: Murder; Aggravated assault
- Penalty: Life imprisonment

Details
- Victims: 2
- Country: United States
- State: Georgia
- Date apprehended: October 14, 1982
- Imprisoned at: Bostick State Prison, Hardwick, Georgia

Judith Neelley
- Born: Judith Ann Adams; June 7, 1964 (age 62); Murfreesboro, Tennessee, U.S.
- Years active: 1982
- Spouse: Alvin Neelley (m. 1980)
- Children: 3
- Convictions: Alabama; Capital murder Georgia; Murder; Attempted murder
- Penalty: Alabama; Death; commuted to life imprisonment Georgia; Life imprisonment

Details
- Victims: 2
- Country: United States
- State: Georgia
- Date apprehended: October 9, 1982
- Imprisoned at: Julia Tutwiler Prison for Women, Wetumpka, Alabama

Alvin Howard Neelley Jr. (July 15, 1953 – October 21, 2005) and Judith Ann Adams Neelley (born June 7, 1964) are an American married couple who committed the kidnappings and torture murders of Lisa Ann Millican and Janice Kay Chatman; they also attempted a third abduction. Judith was sentenced to death in 1983, but her sentence was commuted to life imprisonment in 1999. She served her sentence at the Julia Tutwiler Prison for Women in Wetumpka, Alabama. Alvin was serving a life sentence at the Bostick State Prison in Hardwick, Georgia at the time of his death in 2005.

== Early lives ==
=== Alvin Neelley ===
Alvin Howard Neelley Jr., was born in 1953 in Georgia, where he was a car thief during his teenage years. Alvin was the youngest of three children. He met his second wife, Judith Ann Adams, when he was 26 years old and she was 15. Alvin divorced his first wife shortly before eloping with Judith in 1980.

=== Judith Ann Neelley ===
Judith Ann Adams was born in Murfreesboro, Tennessee, on June 7, 1964. Her father, an alcoholic, died in a motorcycle accident when she was nine. After meeting Neelley, Judith began her life of crime, committing armed robberies across the country (even when heavily pregnant) for which she was later caught. Judith gave birth to twins while incarcerated at Rome, Georgia's Youth Development Center.

== Youth Development Center crimes ==
On September 11, 1982, Ken Dooley, a Youth Development Center employee, was shot at four times. The following day, fellow employee Linda Adair's home was firebombed with a Molotov cocktail. Phone calls were made to the victims following the attacks by a female who claimed to have been sexually abused at the YDC, but neither victim could identify the caller's voice.

== Lisa Ann Millican ==
Lisa Ann Millican
- Born: March 18, 1969
- Disappeared: September 25, 1982; Rome, Georgia, United States
- Died: September 28, 1982 (aged 13); Alabama
- Resting place: Bryan Cemetery, Walker County, Georgia, United States

Lisa Ann Millican (March 18, 1969 – September 28, 1982), a 13-year-old girl from Cedartown, Georgia, was abducted by the Neelleys from Rome's Riverbend Mall on September 25, 1982. She was with other residents of the Ethel Harpst Home, a facility for neglected and abused girls and boys located in Cedartown, Georgia. Separated from her group, Millican was coerced from the mall's gaming arcade by the Neelleys. She was taken to a motel in Scottsboro, Alabama, where the couple held her captive. During her captivity, Lisa was raped by both Neelleys multiple times. On September 28, Judith injected Lisa with Drano, first into one side, and later into both sides of her neck, both arms, and both buttocks in an attempt to poison her to death. Liquid-Plumr was also used in some of the injections.

The Neelleys had previously committed other crimes in the mall, but the Millican case was their move into sexual torture murder.

When the painful poisoning failed to kill her, Lisa was shot in the back execution-style by Judith. Her body was thrown over a cliff in the Little River Canyon in Fort Payne, Alabama. Judith later called various police agencies several times to report the location of Lisa's body, where it was found on the canyon floor draped over a fallen tree.

== Janice Chatman and John Hancock ==
Janice Chatman and John Hancock were a young engaged couple from Rome. On October 4, 1982, they were abducted by Judith. Hancock was shot while Chatman was abducted and brought back to the Neelleys' motel room, where she was tortured and murdered. Hancock survived the shooting and was able to identify the Neelleys as his assailants.

== Arrests and trial ==
Kenneth Kines, the lead detective in the case, followed the Neelleys for three weeks before apprehending them in Murfreesboro, Tennessee.

Judith was arrested on October 9, 1982, and Alvin was taken into custody a few days later. Judith was deduced as being the perpetrator in the YDC attacks. To avoid the death penalty, Alvin pleaded guilty to murder and aggravated assault in Georgia. He was not tried for the Millican murder. He was sentenced to life imprisonment.

Judith's trial began on March 7, 1983, in Fort Payne for the torture-murder of Millican. Before her trial she gave birth to a third child behind bars. The trial lasted for six weeks; Judith was ultimately convicted of the torture murder of Lisa Ann Millican. Despite a jury's recommendation to sentence Judith to life in prison, Judge Randall Cole sentenced the 18-year-old mother of three to death in Alabama's electric chair. After her conviction, Judith pleaded guilty to Chatman's murder.

== Aftermath ==
Alvin was incarcerated at the Bostick State Prison from 1983 until his death in October 2005.

At 18 years old, Judith became the youngest woman sentenced to death in the U.S. She was placed on Alabama's death row, at the Julia Tutwiler Prison for Women. Judith appealed for a new trial, but it was denied in March 1987. In 1989, the U.S. Supreme Court affirmed her death sentence. On January 15, 1999, Governor Fob James commuted her sentence to life in prison with a possibility of parole in another 15 years (thus, a minimum of 31 years in prison). The state had been planning to request an execution date for Neelley that morning.

The decision was met with controversy, but Gov. James – long known for his "tough" position on crime – cited the jury's recommendation for Judith's sentencing. Judith was first elegible for parole in January 2014, at age 49, but the Alabama legislature passed a law in 2003 barring her from applying for release. However, a court later reversed this on constitutional rights.

On May 25, 2023, Neelley was denied parole for a second time, with the Board of Parole and Pardons quickly rejecting her request. Governor Kay Ivey had sent a letter to the board asking for parole to be denied, saying that "Quite simply, Ms. Neelley should not be allowed to set foot outside of an Alabama prison."

== In the media ==
On February 28, 2008, the Neelleys' case was profiled on the Investigation Discovery (ID) program Most Evil. On a scale developed by forensic psychiatrist Michael Stone, Judith was ranked as a category 22 killer, the "most evil" level deemed for serial torture murderers. The Neelleys were later featured on the ID programs Wicked Attraction and Deadly Women.

== See also ==
- List of serial killers in the United States

== Bibliography ==
- Gadsdentimes article (2008)
- wvtm13 article (2007)
