= Carl Patton =

American serial killer

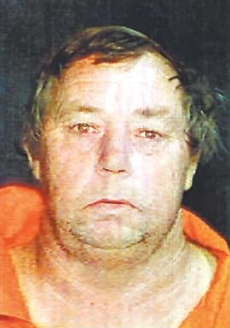
- Mugshot
- Born: Carl Millard Patton, Jr. 1949; Georgia, U.S.
- Died: December 16, 2024 (aged 75); Dodge State Prison, Chester, Georgia, U.S.
- Convictions: Murder x5 Felony theft
- Penalty: Life imprisonment x5 plus 20 years (murders); 1 year (theft)

Details
- Victims: 5
- Span of crimes: 1973–1977
- Country: United States
- State: Georgia
- Date apprehended: February 23, 2003

Carl Millard Patton Jr. (November 1949 – December 16, 2024) was an American serial killer who committed five murders across Georgia from 1973 to 1977 with multiple accomplices. Via DNA testing in 2003, he was arrested for the murders, subsequently pleading guilty and given a life sentence.

== Biography ==
Carl was born in Georgia, in November 1949, to Carl Millard Patton and Iva Mae Wyatt. He was possibly born in Fulton County. They were living in Atlanta on the 1950 census. His mother's 1977 obituary does not mention any other children besides Carl. His father, Carl Sr., worked as a Locomotive Fireman. Carl Jr. spent most of his life in Georgia, having lived in DeKalb, Clayton and Henry counties. In 1968, he married a woman named Norma, with whom he would have two daughters - one in 1970, and Melissa in 1977.

In the 1970s, Patton learned a number of trades in the construction industry, working in the field until his final arrest. In mid-1983, he was arrested for felony theft and convicted of the charge in November, receiving a year of imprisonment as a consequence. He did not serve the sentence in full, as Patton was granted parole and released on May 2, 1984. He is not known to have committed any crimes after this, and no criminal charges were filed against him until his 2003 arrest.

In late 1998, Patton's youngest daughter, 21-year-old Melissa Wolfenbarger, went missing in Atlanta. On April 29, 1999, her severed head was found wrapped up in a garbage bag in a dumpster near her home. On June 3, her dismembered remains were found in black trash bags in another dumpster, but her torso was never found. The remains went unidentified until 2003, after her father's arrest.

== Exposure ==
By early 2003, Patton and his wife had moved to Locust Grove, where he worked as a roofer. On February 23 of that year, Patton was arrested for the murder of 31-year-old Liddie Matthew Evans, who had been murdered in December 1977, after a DNA match linked him to the crime scene. Minutes after his arrest, Norma Patton told the officers that she was willing to testify against her husband in exchange for immunity from prosecution. The DeKalb County Prosecutor's Office made a plea deal with her in which they would drop all accessory to murder charges, in exchange for Norma revealing that her husband and a friend of his, firefighter Joe Cleveland, were responsible for several murders dating back to late 1977.

According to her testimony, on November 12, 1977, Carl and Cleveland shot and killed the former's uncle, 45-year-old Fred Wyatt, as well as Wyatt's roommate, 45-year-old Betty Jo Ephlin. A month later, Patton told his wife that he suspected Cleveland had told mutual acquaintances about the murders, and that he wanted to get rid of him. Norma said that on December 17, Carl lured Cleveland and his roommate Liddie Evans to their home, where Carl shot and killed both with a shotgun. The couple then dragged the bodies out of the house and placed them in a van, after which Norma washed off the blood from the crime scene and destroyed other incriminating evidence. The victims' bodies were then wrapped up in sleeping bags and dumped into the Flint River, where they were discovered several days later.

After disposing of the bodies, Norma said that she cleaned the van, while Carl burned several pieces of bloodstained furniture and other items in their backyard. The couple were questioned about the Cleveland-Evans murders in late 1977 and Carl was even considered a suspect after bloodstains matching Evans' blood were found in the trunk of his car, but he was not charged due to a lack of evidence. He still remained a suspect in the case, and after the cold case was reopened and the DNA tested in 2002, it came back with a positive match.

== Trials ==
Patton's first trial began in early March 2003 in Clayton County, where he was charged with the murders of Fred Wyatt and Betty Jo Ephlin. Serving as the prosecution's key witness, Norma Patton claimed that Carl had been hired to kill Fred by the man's common-law wife, Marie Jackson Wyatt, who had taken out a life insurance policy on him. She claimed that Marie wanted this to be done because her husband was cheating on her with Ephlin, promising to pay Carl $15,000 in exchange. Carl agreed, and together with Cleveland, the pair killed them both, dumping Ephlin's body in the Flint River while Fred's body was placed in his car and left on the railroad tracks. The car was eventually hit by a moving train, making his death appear like an accident.

On March 8, Patton pleaded guilty to all charges, claiming that he felt remorse for his actions. As a result of the plea, he was given two life terms with a chance of parole after serving 20 years. He was then extradited to DeKalb County, where he was charged with the Cleveland-Evans murder. In that case, Norma Patton pleaded guilty and received 12 months probation and a $1,000 fine. On March 15, Carl pleaded guilty to their murders as well, receiving two additional life terms.

=== Admission to additional murder ===
A month after his trials ended, Patton unexpectedly confessed to a fifth murder: that of Richard Russell Jackson - Marie Jackson Wyatt's first husband - who was shot and killed in Henry County on March 9, 1973. He claimed that he had been paid by Marie to carry out this murder, which he committed with the help of Joe Cleveland. Following his confession, Patton was extradited to Henry County to stand trial for this case.

During the proceedings, Patton stated that Marie approached him with the offer of killing Richard in early 1973, claiming that he had been abusive to her. He agreed, and on March 9, he and Cleveland lured Jackson to their car, whereupon they drove to a wooded area near Ellenwood. Patton then pulled out a .22-caliber pistol and aimed it at Jackson, who fiercely resisted and managed to exit the vehicle. He attempted to flee from the men, but Patton and Cleveland caught up to him and gunned him down.

The trial took a strange turn when Gladys Elaine Jackson, the victim's daughter, took the stand and thanked Patton for killing her father, much to the surprise of those present. She confirmed that both her father and her stepfather had abused her mother, additionally claiming that Fred Wyatt had abused her as well. On the other hand, other members of the Jackson family claimed that Marie was a manipulator who wanted insurance money, with one of them, Marie Puckett, claiming that Patton should have been sentenced to death.

On May 14, 2003, Carl Patton pleaded guilty to killing Richard Jackson, after which he was given another life sentence. Marie Jackson Wyatt was never charged for her role in the crimes, as she died in 1988.

== Imprisonment and status ==
Following his convictions, Patton was briefly suspected of murdering his daughter Melissa Wolfenbarger, but eventually ruled out as a suspect. Wolfenbarger's husband, Christopher, was arrested for Melissa's murder in August 2024. He claims that he had always thought his wife had left him of her own volition, and continues to maintain that he is innocent. On August 22, 2025, Wolfenbarger was found not guilty of the murder of Melissa Wolfenbarger.

Patton died in prison in 2024.

== See also ==
- List of serial killers in the United States
