= Lynn Turner (murderer) =

American murderer

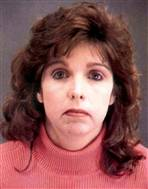
- Born: Julia Lynn Womack; July 13, 1968; Marietta, Georgia, U.S.
- Died: August 30, 2010 (aged 42); Metro State Prison, Georgia, U.S.
- Other names: Antifreeze Killer, Black Widow
- Motive: Life insurance money
- Conviction: Malice murder (2 counts)
- Penalty: Life sentence

Details
- Victims: Maurice Glenn Turner; Randall "Randy" Thompson
- Date: March 3, 1995 / January 22, 2001
- Span of crimes: 1995–2001
- Country: United States
- State: Georgia
- Location: Cobb County/Forsyth County
- Target: Husband/Boyfriend
- Killed: 2
- Weapon: Poisoning (ethylene glycol)
- Date apprehended: November 1, 2002; 23 years ago

Julia Lynn Turner (née Womack; July 13, 1968 – August 30, 2010) was an American woman who was convicted in the poisoning deaths of her two husbands.

Turner's first husband, Glenn Turner, died after allegedly being sick with the flu in 1995. In 2001, the death of Randy Thompson, described as her common-law husband, under arguably similar circumstances aroused the suspicion of law enforcement. After investigation, it was determined by authorities that Turner had murdered both men with ethylene glycol–based antifreeze. Ultimately convicted for the murders, Turner committed suicide in prison on August 30, 2010.

== Early life ==
Julia Lynn was adopted by the Womack family shortly after her birth mother gave her up. The Womacks divorced when Lynn was five, after which Helen Womack took custody of Lynn. Shortly afterwards, Helen Womack married again, and Lynn did not get along well with her new stepfather, D.L. Gregory. As a teenager, Lynn took to substance abuse and was admitted to a clinic in Atlanta for drug problems.

By the 1990s, Lynn Womack was working as a 911 dispatcher for Cobb County, Georgia. Lynn attempted to become a police officer, but she failed the psychological exam.

== Marriage to Glenn Turner ==
In 1991 Julia Lynn met a Cobb County police officer named Maurice Glenn Turner and began to pursue him. She married Glenn Turner in August 1992. Glenn began to work a job at a gas station to support himself and Lynn after she left her job. Shortly after they married, Glenn and Lynn began to have problems in their marriage due to Lynn spending more money than Glenn could make and soon were sleeping in different bedrooms.

Around the same time Lynn began an affair with Forsyth County firefighter Randy Thompson, who was from Warner Robins, Georgia. Glenn was unaware of his wife's affair and by 1995 he began plans to move out and file for divorce. However, before he could go through with it, he fell ill and went to the emergency room on March 2, 1995, complaining of flu-like symptoms. He was treated there, and when he felt better he went home. The next day, he was found dead when Lynn came home. Glenn's cause of death was ruled natural causes due to an irregular heartbeat. After Glenn's death she moved in with Randy Thompson and collected $153,000 from her husband's death and pension.

== Life with Randy Thompson ==
Lynn and Randy bought a house together and had a son and daughter. By 2000 Randy and Lynn were having problems in their relationship, causing Randy to move out. On January 22, 2001, Randy Thompson, age 32, was found dead in his apartment. Thompson had reported feeling ill with flu symptoms and had gone to the emergency room complaining of a stomachache and constant vomiting. He was treated and released on January 21. Lynn made him some Jell-O and by the next day, he was dead. She only collected $36,000 in her boyfriend's death because his $200,000 insurance policy had lapsed. Thompson's reported cause of death was an irregular heartbeat, the same cause of death as Lynn's previous husband.

== Investigation and convictions ==
Shortly after Randy Thompson's death, police reopened the case of Glenn Turner's death after finding that both men died under nearly the same circumstances. Suspecting something sinister, Glenn Turner's mother read Randy Thompson's obituary and called a named relative saying she lost her son very mysteriously as well and stated that both her son and Randy had a common connection to Lynn Turner. Blood tests later found that ethylene glycol–based antifreeze was found in Thompson's system. Police discovered that Lynn had visited an animal shelter, asking about how to put down a stray animal and what poison to use. Glenn Turner's body was exhumed and ethylene glycol was also found in his kidneys. Crime scene photos from Glenn Turner's death contained a photograph of the garage where antifreeze was visible.

Ten months after Randy Thompson's death, Lynn was arrested for Glenn's murder. She was tried for Glenn Turner's murder in 2004 and was found guilty. She went to trial in 2007 for the murder of Randy Thompson, ultimately being convicted. The state contended that she poisoned both men by placing the antifreeze in their food as it is odorless with a sweet taste. She faced execution for the murder of Randy Thompson, but was instead sentenced to life imprisonment without parole. According to the Georgia Department of Corrections website, Turner was serving her sentences at Metro State Prison.

== Death ==
Turner was found dead in prison on August 30, 2010. Her death was ruled a suicide. An episode of Murder She Solved on the Oprah Winfrey Network claimed that she intentionally accumulated enough prescription medication to cause an overdose.

== Media ==
Turner's case has been profiled on many different television programs. Her case first aired on Forensic Files in 2007 in an episode entitled "Cold Hearted". Her case aired on season six of Snapped on the Oxygen Network that year, and three programs on the Investigation Discovery network: Deadly Women, Main Street Mysteries, and Motives and Murders. On July 18, 2012, the ABC show Final Witness told the story from the perspective of her first husband, in an episode entitled Vixen's Elixir. Oxygen True Crime, Charmed to Death “Dispatched” (S1 E6) aired August 22, 2021. Fatal Fraud also aired an episode, "Murder by Antifreeze", on Feb. 16, 2026.

== See also ==
- Stacey Castor
