= Michael Harold Chapel =

American police officer and murderer (born 1960)

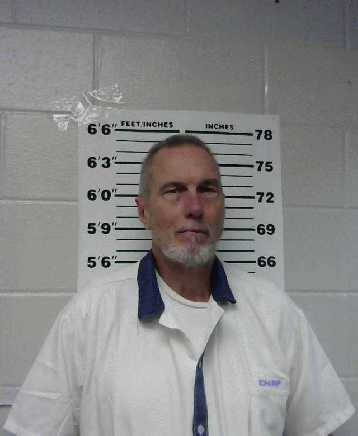
Chapel's mugshot

Michael Harold Chapel (born 1960) is a former Gwinnett County Georgia police officer, who was convicted in the 1993 murder of 53-year-old Emogene Thompson outside a muffler shop on Peachtree Industrial Boulevard in Sugar Hill, Georgia.

== Murder of Emogene Thompson ==
Thompson, who lived in a trailer home with her son, reported to the Gwinnett County Police Department that about half of $14,000 in cash that was in her possession had been stolen. Chapel was the first to respond. He stated to her that because only part of the money was missing, he suspected her son. Thompson told several friends that she was planning to meet with Chapel after he told her he wanted to compare serial numbers on the bills.

On the evening of April 15, 1993, Thompson was shot in the head while she was seated in her parked car. Her body was discovered inside her car, which was still running, the following morning at Gwinnco Muffler Shop on Peachtree Industrial Blvd., in Buford.

== Trial and conviction ==
The case was presided over by Judge Bishop. A jury found Chapel guilty of malice murder, armed robbery, and possession of a firearm in the commission of a felony. The prosecution sought a death sentence, but the jury imposed a life sentence.

Completely independent of both the prosecution and a mandatory Policemen's Benevolent Association (PBA) review of the accusations, Congressman James Traficant launched an investigation of his own into the charges against Chapel.

Chapel is currently held in Long State Prison.
