= DeKalb County Police Department =

Police force in Georgia, U.S.

Agency overview
- Formed: 1915

Jurisdictional structure
- Operations jurisdiction: DeKalb County, Georgia, Georgia, United States
- Area: 271 sq mi (700 km^{2})
- Population: 739,956
- Legal jurisdiction: DeKalb County, Georgia
- Governing body: county
- General nature: Local civilian police

Operational structure
- Headquarters: Tucker, Georgia.
- Officers: 714
- Agency executive: Mirtha V. Ramos stepped down. Interim Chief is Gregory Padrick, Chief of Police
- Precincts: North-Central, South, East, Tucker

Facilities
- Stations: 4
- Helicopters: 2

Website
- www.dekalbcountyga.gov/police-services/welcome

The DeKalb County Police Department (DKPD) is the primary law enforcement agency for unincorporated DeKalb County, Georgia, as well as the incorporated cities of Tucker and Stonecrest. The department serves a population of more than 730,000 people. The chief is Mirtha V. Ramos.

The DeKalb County Police Department has been accredited by the Commission on Accreditation for Law Enforcement Agencies since 1991.

== History ==
The DeKalb County Police Department was founded on December 18, 1915. On two occasions, in 1923 and 1931, the department was eliminated, as the county commissioners felt that the department was not serving the best interests of the public. In both cases the department was quickly reinstated.

In the early years the department had only a handful of officers. Hiring was sporadic, there was no chief, and officers worked out of the DeKalb County Solicitor's Office.

From the department's inception until the end of prohibition in 1933, a DeKalb County Police officer's primary responsibility was to apprehend bootleggers. Officers Samuel Gentry, Lewell Henderson, Miles Phillips, and Charles Wright were all killed in incidents involving suspected bootleggers. During the remainder of the 1930s, the Department's primary focus was the Enforcement of Traffic regulations and local county ordinances At the beginning of the 1940s, DeKalb had just 20 police officers. In 1947, Under County Commissioner Scott Candler, a program was started to expand and better train and equip the department, starting with the introduction of two-way car radios. The radio system afforded officers greater mobility and increased their effectiveness, before the radio system, officers had to regularly call in on over 40 Police Call Boxes Strategically placed around the County for Dispatching and Instructions. The radios, along with the addition of a new fleet of patrol cars in 1949 allowed officers to quickly respond to calls, that same year DeKalb Police moved into headquarters located in the county complex on Camp Drive. In the 1950s the department added more officers, formed Traffic Enforcement, Criminal Investigation, and a Records and Identification section, and responsibilities between the Sheriff and the Police Dept. were more clearly defined. By 1960 the department had grown to over 100 officers, and efforts were made for DeKalb to organize their own Academy.

By 1968, the department had expanded to a force of approximately 200 officers, and added new Specialized Investigation units such as Robbery/Homicide, Juvenile, and Narcotics to the Dept. In 1972, the DeKalb Police formed an Aviation Unit, and received their first helicopter, a Hughes Model 300C when the Dept. moved into a newly built public safety complex on Camp Circle in Decatur which when constructed had a helipad installed on the roof. The department would remain at this location for more than thirty years. The location is still the home to several units within the police department. By the mid 1970's the Department formed a SWAT unit, combined several investigative functions into a Major Felony Unit, and fielded mobile Crime Scene, Accident Reconstruction and Community Relations Units. Massive growth in DeKalb soon required the ranks to expand to over 500 officers.

The murder of Officer William David Corn on February 1, 1972 is the agency's only unsolved police murder.

In 2006 the DeKalb County Police department had outgrew its headquarters and moved to its current headquarters at 1960 W. Exchange Place in Tucker.

With the incorporation of the City of Dunwoody in 2008 and the incorporation of the City of Brookhaven in 2013, most of North Precinct's patrol area was absorbed into these cities. As a result, the precinct was closed on August 17, 2013, reducing the department's total number of precincts from five to four.

As metropolitan Atlanta grew, so did the DeKalb County Police Department. In the last forty years, DKPD has expanded from 200 officers to its current staff of 714 sworn officers as of December 1, 2019.

=== Chief Terrell Bolton controversy ===
In late 2006, then-county CEO Vernon Jones hired Terrell Bolton to serve as chief of police. Bolton had previously been the chief of the Dallas Police Department, and was terminated by that agency in 2003.

Bolton's tenure with the DeKalb Police was fraught with controversy. The chief was accused of taking unauthorized time off work and misusing luxury vehicles seized by the department. In February 2009, under mounting pressure from the media, the public, and officers within the department, newly elected county CEO Burrell Ellis placed Bolton on administrative leave. Bolton was terminated shortly after being placed on leave. In a letter sent to Bolton, Ellis outlined his reasons for terminating the chief. The letter provided examples of Bolton's insubordination, misuse of county property, and conduct unbecoming an officer. Major William O'Brien, a 24-year veteran of the department, was named acting chief after Bolton was placed on administrative leave.

Bolton appealed his termination, and an employment hearing was held in June 2009. The hearing was expected to end on June 11, but was continued to July 15, 2009. On August 17, 2009, Hearing Officer Phyllis Williams released a ruling which upheld Bolton's termination.

== Specialized units ==
The following is a partial list of specialized units within the department:

Traffic Specialist Unit (TSU): Responsible for investigating traffic fatalities and hit-and-runs.

Crime Scene Investigation: Responsible for forensic work and investigating the scenes of serious crimes such as a murder for example.

SWAT Team: Responsible for serving high-risk warrants, performing hostage rescues, and defusing other high-risk situations. The department maintains a full-time SWAT team which is augmented by part-time members who serve in other positions throughout the department.

S.T.A.R. Team: The S.T.A.R. (Strategic Traffic Accident Reduction) Team is responsible for providing specialized enforcement of driving under the influence (DUI), aggressive driving, and speeding laws.

Aerial Support Unit: The Aerial Support Unit operates two Eurocopter AS-350 B-2 helicopters. Both helicopters are equipped with FLIR, Forward Looking Infrared cameras that allow the flight crew to locate individuals in total darkness. The helicopters are also equipped with 30 million candlepower spotlights and Lojack systems for locating stolen vehicles. The Aerial Support Unit is the only law enforcement unit in the southeast with chemical monitoring capability.

== Precincts ==
The department operates four precincts:

- North-Central Precinct, 1960 W. Exchange Pl., Tucker, Georgia 30084
- South Precinct, 2842 HF Shepherd Dr., Decatur, Georgia 30032
- East Precinct, 2484 Bruce St., Lithonia, Georgia 30058
- Tucker Precinct, 4451 Lawrenceville Hwy., Tucker, Georgia 30084

== Rank structure ==
Insignia	Rank title	Information
	Chief of Police	Commander of the department.
	Assistant Chief of Police	Second-in-command of the department.
	Major	Commander of a Division or Precinct.
	Captain	Commander of a Section or second-in-command of a Precinct.
	Lieutenant	Commander of a Unit.
	Sergeant	Commander of a Squad.
	Master Police Officer	Attained after 2 years and an exam.
	Police Officer Senior	Attained after 12 months.
	Police Officer	Base rank upon hiring.

== Fallen officers ==
31 DeKalb County Police officers have been killed while on duty. Captain and DeKalb County Sheriff-elect Derwin Brown was killed on December 16, 2000 by his predecessor and defeated rival Sidney Dorsey.
