= Ware State Prison =

Prison in Georgia, United States

Coordinates: 31°15′25″N 82°23′38″W

- Interactive map of Ware State Prison
- Location: 3620 Harris Road Waycross, Georgia
- Status: open
- Security class: close security
- Capacity: 1546
- Opened: 1990
- Managed by: Georgia Department of Corrections

Ware State Prison is a Georgia Department of Corrections state prison for men located in Waycross, Ware County, Georgia.

The facility first opened in 1990, and has a maximum capacity of 1546 inmates.

== History ==
In 2013, the prison was involved in a series of lawsuits related to an attack on an inmate. The inmate, Cleveland Dunn, was attacked by a fellow inmate on September 9, 2011. Dunn alleged in his lawsuit that he did not receive adequate care for his injuries. Dunn claimed that over two weeks had passed before he was taken to Augusta State Medical Prison for medical treatment related to his injuries. In September 2016, the last of Dunn's lawsuits was dismissed; most of them due to immunity from prosecution under Georgia law.

=== 2020 ===
Over the course of 2020, a number of inmates and staff contracted COVID-19. The state of Georgia reported 26 inmates and 58 staff members infected as of September 11, 2020, with two inmates dying from the virus.

On July 17, an investigation was launched into an incident where an inmate, Robert Wilson, was attacked by another inmate. Wilson died of his injures the same day. Wilson's death was the third Georgia inmate of four to have died in July as a result of violence.

During the evening of August 1, a riot broke out at the prison that left at least three inmates and two staff members injured. In the aftermath of the riot, the Human and Civil Rights Coalition of Georgia claimed that there had been ongoing issues at the prison since April.
