= Albany Transitional Center =

Minimum-security prison

Coordinates: 31.5804°N 84.1512°W

- Interactive map of Albany Transitional Center
- Location: 304 N Washington Street Albany, Georgia
- Status: open
- Security class: minimum
- Capacity: 155
- Opened: 1906
- Managed by: Georgia Department of Corrections

Albany Transitional Center is located in Albany, Georgia in Dougherty County, Georgia. The facility houses 150 adult male felons, it was constructed in 1906. It was renovated in 1990 and re-opened in 1991. It is a minimum-security prison.
