= Baldwin State Prison =

Prison in Milledgeville, Georgia, United States

Coordinates: 33°01′41″N 83°13′10″W

- Interactive map of Baldwin State Prison
- Location: 140 Laying Farm Road Milledgeville, Georgia (Hardwick postal address)
- Status: open
- Security class: medium
- Capacity: 925
- Opened: 1976
- Managed by: Georgia Department of Corrections

The Baldwin State Prison, previously the Baldwin Correctional Institution and the Georgia Women's Correctional Institution (GWCI), is a prison located in Milledgeville, Georgia, United States, with a Hardwick postal address. The prison has a capacity of 900. After complaints in the early 1990s by more than 200 women of sexual abuse by guards, an investigation was conducted. More than a dozen guards were prosecuted. The state decided to move the women to other prison facilities for a total change in culture. This facility now houses only adult male felons, with a capacity of 992.

Also on the prison grounds is a boot camp which houses 240. It was constructed and opened in 1979. It was renovated in 1989 and re-opened in 1990. It is a medium security prison. It is a part of the Georgia Department of Corrections.

== History ==
In 1976 the prison was opened as Georgia Women's Correctional Institution (GWCI), housing female inmates.

In 1984 several women at GWCI sued the prison, accusing employees of committing sexual abuse. By September 1, 1992, 70 women at GWCI said that prison guards had sexually abused them. By 1993 over 180 prisoners at GWCI stated that prison guards had sexually abused them.

In the early 1990s, based on affidavits of almost 200 prisoners at GWCI who said they had been abused, more than 12 DOC employees were suspended, fired, and transferred. Several top administrators in the department and several top employees at GWCI were relieved of their positions. As part of the scandal, 15 men and women were indicted on criminal charges of sexually abusing prisoners. Two prison guards pleaded guilty and received probation. A Baldwin County jury acquitted another prison guard. The state dropped charges against the other accused parties. In 1992 Mary Esposito, a native of Waycross, Georgia and the first female warden of an all-male prison in Georgia, took over as the warden of Baldwin State; she had been transferred from the Burruss Correctional Training Center.

Until 1992 the prison housed female death row inmates. In 1992 the sentence of the state's only female death row inmate was commuted to life in prison.

In 1993 Governor of Georgia Zell Miller announced that the women from the Georgia Women's Correctional Institution would be moved to the Metro State Prison near Atlanta, which was to be emptied of its male prisoners. The officials scheduled the completion of the swap on July 1, 1993. Lynn Cook of the Atlanta Journal-Constitution said that the swap occurred partly "to get the female inmates out of a culture at Georgia Women’s Correctional Institution that had allowed officers and other workers at the prison to engage in sexual relationships with inmates." The former GWCI was renamed as the Baldwin Correctional Institution and used to house male inmates.

On April 28, 1995, the remaining 30 women at the facility were transferred out. Most of the women were sent to Washington Correctional Institution. Others went to Metro and to the Pulaski Correctional Institution.

Baldwin was one of the 7 prisons that participated in the 2010 Georgia prison strike.

Baldwin was one of nine Georgia state prisons implicated in an FBI sting operation announced in February 2016. The agency indicted 47 correction officers who had agreed to deliver illegal drugs while in uniform. These charges were "part of a larger public corruption investigation into Georgia Correctional Facilities".

Around 5:45 a.m. on June 13, 2017, a group of inmates from this prison were being transported in a bus on Georgia Highway 16, in Putnam County, Georgia. Two inmates overpowered the guards and obtained their firearms. The suspects then shot and killed two of the guards, escaped the scene and later stole a vehicle. Following an unsuccessful home invasion, the suspects were caught two days later in Shelbyville, Tennessee, and taken into custody.

== Location ==
The prison is located in Milledgeville, Baldwin County, Georgia. with a Hardwick postal address. It is in proximity to Hardwick, and south of the center of Milledgeville, in the middle Georgia region. The prison was in a wooded area off of a main road. It is a part of the Middle Georgia Correctional Complex, which has five prisons.

In 1992 Eric Harrison of the Los Angeles Times said that it "resembles nothing so much as a low-lying suburban office park or a modern middle school."

== Notes ==
- Siegel, Larry and Clemens Bartollas. Corrections Today. Cengage Learning, January 29, 2010. ISBN 049560240X, 9780495602408.
