= Men's State Prison =

Former prison in Baldwin County, Georgia, United States

Coordinates: 33.046867°N 83.223976°W

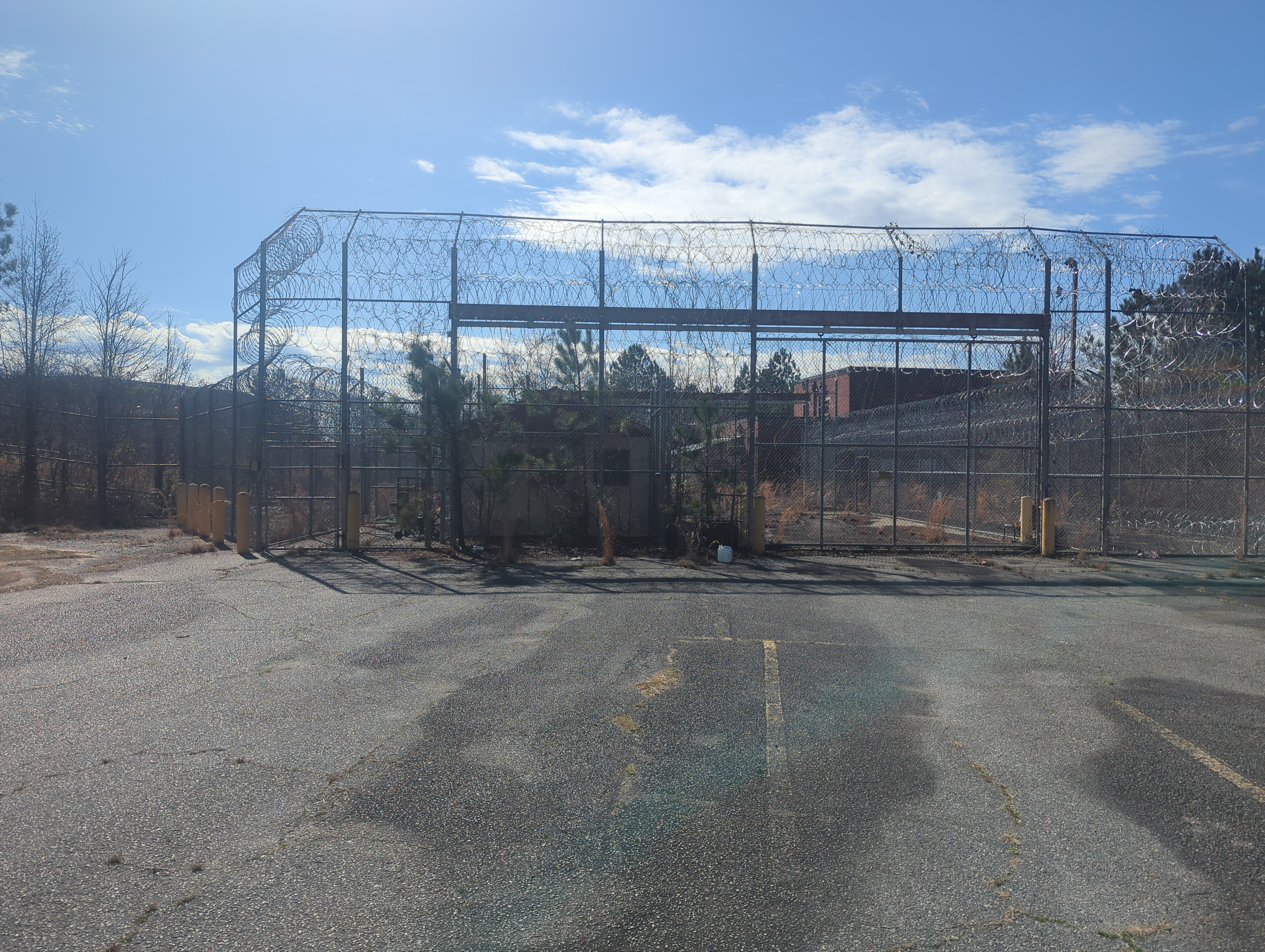
- Interactive map of Men's State Prison
- Location: Lawrence Road Milledgeville, Georgia
- Status: closed
- Security class: medium / mixed
- Capacity: 600
- Opened: 1950
- Closed: 2011
- Managed by: Georgia Department of Corrections

Men's State Prison was a Georgia Department of Corrections prison for men in Milledgeville, Georgia, near Hardwick. The facility closed in 2011.
