= Ashley Diamond =

Transgender activist

- Born: 1978 (age 47–48)
- Occupation: Civil rights activist
- Years active: 2015-present
- Website: web.archive.org/web/20161020174215/http://www.ashleydiamondofficial.com/

Ashley Diamond (born 1978) is an American transgender civil-rights activist, singer, and actress. She is known for suing the Georgia Department of Corrections twice for incarcerating her with male inmates and refusing to provide her with medical treatment she had been receiving since she was a teenager.

Diamond was imprisoned in 2012 for a nonviolent offense and held in a men's facility. While in prison she was denied medically necessary hormones she had been taking for over seventeen years, was beaten and sexually assaulted by inmates with no help from prison guards. From inside the prison, Diamond partnered with the Southern Poverty Law Center (SPLC) to file a lawsuit against the Georgia Department of Corrections, settling for an undisclosed amount.

In 2015, Diamond was released on parole and in 2016 received a settlement in the lawsuit, and the Georgia Department of Corrections changed its medical treatment policy for transgender prisoners. The US Department of Justice became involved, saying that prisons must treat hormone therapy as they would any other medical condition. Beth Litrell of the SPLC attributed the change to Diamond's lawsuit. In 2019, Georgia adopted a new policy governing the treatment of transgender and intersex prisoners that according to The New York Times was intended to address prisoner safety issues, including assessing placement decisions using input on the prisoner's own views of their safety, and to reassess placements after sexual assault.

In October 2019, Diamond was again arrested and imprisoned on parole violation charges. She was again placed in a men's facility. According to Diamond, by November 2020, she had been sexually assaulted fourteen times by other inmates and prison staff and had been denied hormone treatment therapy. On November 23, 2020, Diamond, the Center for Constitutional Rights, and the SPLC filed a federal civil rights lawsuit; the U.S. Department of Justice again intervened in the case. On August 12, 2022, Diamond was released to serve the remainder of her sentence on parole. On January 20, 2023, shortly before the trial was set to start, Diamond moved to voluntarily dismiss the suit in order to focus on her recovery.

== Early life, work, and imprisonment ==
Diamond was born in 1978 to a large Southern Baptist family and raised in Rome, Georgia. She has lived as a transgender woman since she was a teenager, starting hormone therapy at age 17. She moved to Atlanta and began performing in cabarets doing Whitney Houston impersonations.

Diamond was originally imprisoned in 2012 on burglary charges, for which she was sentenced to ten years. She was also charged with attempted escape during an arrest. She was held at Valdosta State Prison and Coastal State Prison.

After her 2015 release, as part of her eight-year parole, she was required to return to Rome, where she had a 4:30 pm curfew and was unable to find work. She became occasionally homeless and was arrested on a parole violation and returned to prison in October 2019. She was first held in the Georgia Diagnostic and Classification Prison and then moved to Coastal State Prison.

=== Television ===
Year	Title	Role	Notes
2016	Gaycation	Herself	Episode: "Deep South"
