= Johnson State Prison =

Prison in Wrightsville, Georgia, United States

Coordinates: 32°44′36″N 82°42′08″W

- Interactive map of Johnson State Prison
- Location: Wrightsville, Georgia
- Status: open
- Security class: medium
- Capacity: 1600
- Opened: 1992
- Managed by: Georgia Department of Corrections

Johnson State Prison is located in Wrightsville, Georgia in Johnson County, Georgia. It is a medium security prison owned and operated by the Georgia Department of Corrections, it houses adult male felons. The facilities' capacity is 1600 inmates. Construction began in 1991 and it was opened in 1992. In 1996 Johnson State prison was converted into a Juvenile Boot Camp "Wrightsville Boot Camp" for short term (30-180 Days) and long term (180 days up to a maximum of 1 year) Juvenile delinquent offenders as status or repeat/habitual offenders. It was shut down as a boot camp 2 years later due to restructuring of the Juvenile Justice system throughout the state and converted back to adult male felon offenders in 1998 and all current juvenile offenders were transferred to other facilities throughout the state.

== Housing Departments ==
- Supportive Living Unit - Mental Health Capacity 96 inmates (double bunk)
- Assisted Living Unit - General Inmates Capacity 72 inmates (segregation - isolation)

== Work Detail ==
- Work Detail is where inmates have unpaid jobs and duties assigned by the prison or state.
- Work assigned for Johnson State Prison inmates is from the City Of Wrightsville, Georgia, City Of Sandersville, Georgia, City Of Swainsboro, Georgia, and Georgia Department Of Transportation.

== Programs ==
- Academic: Literacy, GED, ABE, GSAMS
- Substance Abuse: Residential Substance Abuse Treatment (RSAT), Prevention Redesign Initiative (PRI)
- Counseling: Corrective Thinking, Stress Management, Pre-Release, Mental Health Awareness, Victim Impact
- Recreation: General Recreation
- Religious Activities: Various Religious Activities
- Vocational/OJT: Building Maintenance, Horticulture, Laundry and Customer Service

== Sources ==
ALL INFORMATION ON THIS PAGE IS FROM THE GEORGIA DEPARTMENT OF CORRECTIONS
