= Riverbend Correctional Facility =

Prison in Baldwin County, Georgia, United States

Coordinates: 33°01′41″N 83°13′11″W

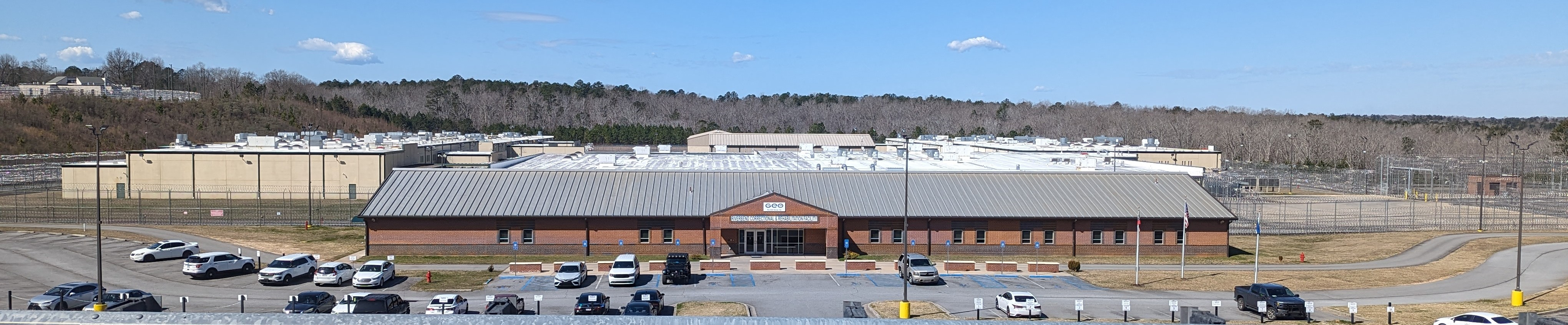
- Interactive map of Riverbend Correctional Facility
- Location: 196 Laying Farm Road Milledgeville, Georgia
- Status: open
- Security class: medium security
- Capacity: 1588
- Opened: 2011
- Managed by: GEO Group

Riverbend Correctional Facility (RBCF) is a privately operated, medium-security prison for men, owned and operated by the GEO Group under contract with the Georgia Department of Corrections. The facility was built in 2011 in Milledgeville, Baldwin County, Georgia.

The maximum capacity of the prison is 1588 inmates.
