= Stacey Castor =

American convicted murderer (1967–2016)

- 2007 mugshot, Onondaga County Sheriff’s Dept
- Born: Stacey Ruth Daniels; July 24, 1967; Clay, New York, U.S.
- Died: June 11, 2016 (aged 48); Bedford Hills, New York, U.S.
- Occupation: Office manager
- Spouses: Michael Wallace (m. 1988; died 2000) David Castor (m. 2003; died 2005)
- Children: 2
- Parent(s): Jerry Daniels and Judie Eaton
- Motive: Monetary gain
- Conviction: February 5, 2009
- Criminal charges: Murder, attempted murder, forgery
- Penalty: 51 years to life in prison

Stacey Ruth Castor (née Daniels, formerly Wallace; July 24, 1967 – June 11, 2016) was an American convicted murderer from Weedsport, New York. In 2009, she was found guilty of murdering her then-husband David Castor with antifreeze in 2005 and attempting to murder her daughter, Ashley Wallace, by spiking her drinks with pills in 2007. In addition, she was suspected of having murdered her first husband, Michael Wallace, in 2000; his grave lay next to David's until the latter's remains were disinterred and buried elsewhere in 2016. The story made national news, and Castor was subsequently named the "Black Widow" by media outlets.

== Early life ==
Stacey Castor was born Stacey Daniels in Clay, New York, on July 24, 1967. Her parents were Jerry Daniels and Judie Eaton. Castor met her first husband, Michael Wallace, in 1984 when she was 17. The couple married and had their first daughter, Ashley, in 1987. A second daughter, Bree, was born in 1991.

Castor was employed by an ambulance dispatch company, while Wallace worked nights as a mechanic, but the family had little money. According to Castor, Wallace was very close to Bree, showing a favoritism that Castor made up for by becoming "best friends" with elder daughter Ashley. Despite their closeness with their children, the couple grew apart, and it was rumored that each was having extramarital affairs.

== Murders ==
In late 1999, Wallace began feeling intermittently ill. Family members variously remember him as acting unsteady, coughing and seeming swollen. As his inexplicable sickness persisted over the holiday season, his family encouraged him to seek medical care, but he died in early 2000 before he could do so. Physicians told Castor that her husband had died of a heart attack. Although Wallace's sister was skeptical and requested an autopsy, Castor refused, saying she believed the doctors were correct.

In 2003, Stacey married David Castor, whose surname she used from that point forward. David was the owner of an air conditioning installation and repair company, and she served as his office manager. One afternoon in August 2005, Castor called the Onondaga County sheriff's office to tell them that her husband had locked himself in their bedroom following an argument and had not been seen nor heard from for the past day, claiming he was depressed. Upon visiting the house for a wellness check, Sergeant Robert Willoughby kicked in the door of the bedroom and found David dead. Among the items near his body were a container of antifreeze and a half-full glass of bright green liquid. Willoughby says he remembers that Castor screamed, "He's not dead, he's not dead."

The coroner reported that David had committed suicide through a self-administered lethal dose of antifreeze, but when police found Castor's fingerprints on the antifreeze glass and located a turkey baster that had David's DNA on the tip, they began to suspect she had engineered his death. They believed Castor had used the turkey baster to force-feed David once he became too physically weak.

Investigators secured audio and visual surveillance on Castor's house and the gravesites of her husbands, who had been buried side by side at her request. Detectives reasoned that if Castor were truly genuine about her love for her late husbands, then she would eventually visit their graves. Castor, however, never visited. Investigators soon felt the only way to prove she was responsible for both homicides was to have Wallace's body exhumed. A toxicology screen ruled that Wallace had also been killed through antifreeze poisoning.

=== Attempted murder ===
In September 2007, Castor panicked as suspicion mounted over the deaths of her husbands. After learning that police had exhumed Wallace's body and found traces of antifreeze in his system, she was believed to have devised a plan to set up her daughter Ashley for the murders.

On Ashley's first day of college, investigators came to her school to question her about Wallace's death and to inform her that he had been poisoned. An upset Ashley called Castor. Soon after, Ashley said, Castor invited her to the family home in Liverpool to have a drink together. Ashley agreed because Castor was not only her mother but her "best friend".

The following day, Castor invited Ashley to drink at home again, offering a "nasty-tasting" drink that she initially refused. Seventeen hours later, Ashley was found comatose in bed by her younger sister Bree. Bree demanded that help be sought, and Castor made the 911 call. Ashley's sister left her side for a moment and when she returned, she found a suicide note next to Ashley that contained a supposed confession to the murders of her father and stepfather. Castor quickly took the note and later gave it to paramedics.

Tests revealed that potentially fatal painkillers had been found in Ashley's system, and that she most likely would have died if she had been taken to the hospital just a few minutes later. When Ashley woke up, police questioned her about the murders and the suicide note; she said the last thing she remembered was her mother making her an alcoholic drink, something she had never done before. She told the officers that she did not write the note and was confused about their questions.

== Arrest and trial ==
For two years, investigators had collected evidence against Castor for the deaths of her husbands. In 2007, she was arrested for second-degree murder in David's death and for attempting to murder and frame Ashley.

Prosecutors argued that Ashley's computer-written "suicide note" had actually been written by Castor. Ashley was 12 at the time of her father Wallace's death. When brought on the stand, she testified that she did not murder either her father or her stepfather nor did she write the suicide note. Onondaga County District Attorney William Fitzpatrick and Chief Assistant District Attorney Christine Garvey argued that David's "suicide" had never made sense given the lack of his fingerprints on the glass or container tainted with ethylene glycol, a toxic substance found in antifreeze, and the turkey baster found in the kitchen garbage bearing both ethylene glycol and his DNA. They felt that this suggested he was force-fed the antifreeze. Given evidence of the evolution of David's illness, they concluded that Castor had fed her husband antifreeze through the baster before trying to make it look like a suicide. She had said that her husband got the idea to kill himself with antifreeze while both were watching a news report about Lynn Turner, who murdered two past lovers by using the poison.

Prosecutors presented evidence showing how antifreeze poisoning can be identified from the growth of calcium oxalate crystals in the kidneys, and that this was seen in Wallace and David's autopsies. In addition, they noted money as one of the main reasons Castor murdered her husbands. She had wanted to collect on their life insurance and estates, and had changed David's will to exclude his son by a previous marriage from the money left to him by David.

"In 2005, people started to put it together," Cayuga County Sheriff Dave Gould said. "If Mr. Wallace had been cremated, or if Mr. Castor had not died, we would never have known we had a homicide."

If there is a ceiling in terms of evil, she (Castor) is at the ceiling.

— District Attorney William Fitzpatrick

Having searched Castor's computer, prosecutors had found several drafts of the purported suicide note. Forensic investigators found that based on the timestamps, it had been written while Ashley was in school, proving she couldn't have been its author. They argued that the "suicide attempt" had actually been a premeditated murder attempt. On the stand, Ashley retold how her mother had convinced her to drink before her near-death. She repeated that she only drank the "nasty-tasting" beverage because she trusted her mother. She maintained her innocence in the murders and denied writing of the suicide note.

Castor's defense team—attorneys Charles Keller and Todd Smith—was set on creating reasonable doubt about Castor's role in the murders. They wanted to "poke holes" in Ashley's version of events and prove that she could have been capable of murdering Wallace when she was 11 years old. They noted Wallace showed favoritism toward Bree rather than Ashley and cited jealousy as a possible motive for Ashley having murdered at such a young age. For David, they noted his and Ashley's tumultuous relationship. Castor's mother believed her granddaughter to be guilty. In a final attempt to convince the jury that she was not guilty, Castor took the stand.

On cross-examination, Fitzpatrick pointed out what he felt were flaws in Castor's version of that night. She maintained that it was Ashley who murdered Wallace and David although she would not speculate about motives beyond implying that her daughter was mentally ill. Fitzpatrick pointed out that Castor had never sought therapy for Ashley and that Ashley had never exhibited signs of mental illness.

Fitzpatrick asserted that Castor's behavior during David's and Ashley's illnesses made no sense, given the years she had worked for an ambulance company. She did not seek care for Ashley for seventeen hours and indicated that David, who was staggering and vomiting and unable to stand, "looked OK". Likewise, he questioned how a woman who had lost two husbands to poisoning would not seek help for a daughter in Ashley's state. Fitzpatrick frequently shouted at Castor, causing Keller to frequently object and even request a mistrial.

Prosecutors brought up another piece of damaging evidence when they cited "typing sounds" on police wiretaps. During one of the recordings presented, typing sounds can be heard while Castor talks to a friend although she denied memory of using the computer that day. Prosecutors argued that these typing sounds were those of one of the several drafts Castor had written of the suicide note. Ashley had already testified to having witnessed her mother working on the computer, which Castor had hidden to prevent Ashley's seeing it.

Fitzpatrick claimed this was the day Castor wrote the note, which had her fingerprints but not Ashley's, to frame her daughter. He told the jury about the word antifreeze being written as "anti-free" in four places within the note and noted that Castor had also said "anti-free" during an interview. Castor said she had cut herself off while saying "antifreeze" because she had intended to say something else.

Castor's defense team presented a pharmaceutical expert in an attempt to cast doubt on the prosecution's claim that Castor had drugged Ashley seventeen hours prior to being taken to the hospital.

On February 5, 2009, Castor was found guilty of second-degree murder in the poisoning death of David and of attempted second degree murder for overdosing Ashley. Castor had her eyes closed as the verdicts were read. Keller announced that she would appeal the verdict, including challenging the inclusion of evidence regarding the death of Wallace, for which Castor had not been charged.

On March 5, 2009, at Castor's sentencing, Garvey asked Judge Fahey to impose the maximum consecutive sentences because of the brutality of David's death. Further, she criticized how Castor had "partied in her backyard with friends like nothing was happening" as Ashley was comatose in her room. "She is cold, calculating and without any emotion for what she has done," she stated. "Human life is sacred. Stacey Castor places no value on human life, not even her own flesh and blood. To Stacey Castor, human beings are disposable." David's son, whom Castor had cheated out of his inheritance, pleaded with Judge Fahey for Castor to be severely punished. "Your honor, [Castor] is a monster and a threat to society," he said. "She has created so much pain and death with this, creating multiples of pain and death, in the families of those she has hurt."

Judge Fahey told Castor that he had never seen a parent attempt to murder their child in order to set their child up for a crime they themselves committed, and declared Castor "in a class all by [her]self". He sentenced her to the maximum of twenty-five years to life for the murder of David, and to an additional twenty-five years for the attempt to kill Ashley. For forging David's will, he ordered Castor to serve an additional 1 1/3 to four years in prison.

The trial had lasted for four weeks. An emotional Ashley told the judge she hated her mother "for ruining so many people's lives", but still loved her for the bond she had originally had with her.

I never knew what hate was until now. Even though I do hate her, I still love her at the same time. That bothers me, it is so confusing. How can you hate someone and love them at the same time? I just wish that she would say sorry for everything she did, including all the lies. As horrible as it makes me feel, this is goodbye mom. As hard as you tried, I survived and I will survive because now I'm surrounded by people that love me. I'm going to do good things in this world despite making me in every sense of the word an orphan.

— Ashley Wallace

Fitzpatrick said that under New York sentencing guidelines, Castor would have to serve just over 51 years before she became eligible for parole—at her age, effectively a life sentence.

== Aftermath ==
Castor, New York Department of Corrections inmate number 09G0209, was placed in Bedford Hills Correctional Facility for Women in Bedford Hills, New York. Even with credit for time served, her earliest possible release date was June 15, 2055—slightly over a month shy of her 88th birthday.

On April 24, 2009, ABC News aired a two-hour 20/20 special about Castor's trial. During the trial, Castor had been dubbed "The Black Widow" by media outlets, a title previously given to Lynn Turner. Ashley said that she does not know how her mother, or any mother, could try to kill her own child, a question that the public has also pondered. Castor, who professed to being shocked at the verdict, maintained her innocence during the 20/20 special, as well as in unaired parts of the program. She said that "Ashley brought this on" and insists that she and Ashley know what really happened. She did express sympathy for her daughter Bree. She indicated that her mother, stepfather and some other relatives still supported her.

Bree, like Ashley, never spoke to Castor after the trial. She said that though losing her mother was hard, "I was happy that they said she was guilty because we all know that she's guilty." Ashley said, "I would have done anything for her. But she tried to kill me instead." Both of Castor's daughters expressed concern that their mother had not yet apologized to them. Castor maintained that she was innocent of the crimes.

ABC interviewed forensic psychiatrist Dr. James Knoll about the case, and he answered viewers' questions via video on April 23, 2009, and via site comments on April 27, 2009. He stated that while most suicide notes focus on themes of remorse and the person not being able to go on with life, the note supposedly written by Ashley was focused on taking the blame off Castor. He said that this theme had been repeated fourteen times within the note and that he believed Castor would never admit guilt. The code of murderers such as these, he said, is "deny, deny, deny" until the bitter end. When asked if Castor's behavior and body language on the stand showed any sort of clue about her mental state and guilt, Knoll said that body language and behavior can be affected by events during a trial and that their interpretation is not always reliable.

Though Castor was not officially defined as a serial killer, it is likely that she would have killed again. Knoll said that killers may have many different motivations. He described Castor as a "black widow" type rather than a typical serial killer. He stated that "psychopathic traits and histories of childhood abuse have been consistently reported in these women" and suggested that if Castor were guilty of the crimes of which she had been convicted and accused, then she would be demonstrating psychopathic traits, including regarding even her own child as an object to be used for her convenience.

In addition to the Turner and Castor antifreeze murder cases, similar cases were reported in 2008. In 2002, a man was convicted for the 1998 murder of his wife by antifreeze. A letter she had written before her death incriminated him as the murderer if she were to die eventually; the letter led to his prosecution. Series Sex Lies and Murder, series 2 episode 3, in addition to describing the events leading to the trial, included an interview with the district attorney in the case. The DA pointed out that Castor may have murdered her own father, Jerry Daniels, who died February 22, 2002, shortly after his daughter visited him in the hospital where he had a minor lung complaint. Castor's first husband's family believes Castor may have killed her father by bringing in an open can of soda for her father to drink. She was the executor of his estate.

== Death ==
Castor was found dead in her cell on the morning of June 11, 2016. It was not immediately apparent how she died and the manner of her death was listed as undetermined; it was later determined by the D.A.'s office that she died of a heart attack, with no evidence of suicide or foul play.

== Television film ==
Stacey Castor's story was adapted into the Lifetime film, Poisoned Love: The Stacey Castor Story, as part of its "Ripped from the Headlines" feature-film series; this made-for-television film was first transmitted on February 1, 2020. The film starred Nia Vardalos as Castor.
