= Charles D. Hudson Transitional Center =

Georgia work release facility

- Interactive map of Charles D. Hudson Transitional Center
- Location: LaGrange, Georgia; 33.024909°N 84.969411°W
- Status: Operational
- Security class: Minimum
- Capacity: 155
- Opened: 2003
- Former name: LaGrange Transitional Center
- Managed by: Georgia Department of Corrections

Charles D. Hudson Transitional Center is a Georgia Department of Corrections work release facility located in LaGrange, Georgia. Opened in 2003, the center houses 155 adult male offenders. Residents in the work release program are given the opportunity to obtain employment in the community and address reentry-related needs prior to release.
