= Coastal State Prison =

State prison in Savannah, Georgia, US

Coordinates: 32°08′15″N 81°11′11″W

- Interactive map of Coastal State Prison
- Location: 200 Gulfstream Road Port Wentworth, Georgia
- Status: open
- Security class: medium
- Capacity: 1836
- Opened: 1981
- Managed by: Georgia Department of Corrections

Coastal State Prison is a Georgia Department of Corrections medium-security state prison located in Savannah, near Garden City. The facility houses adult male felons and has a capacity of 1836. It was constructed and opened in 1981 and later renovated in 1999.

The prison consists of twelve housing units. Six units contain 36 cells each, divided into 12 two-man cells and 24 four-man cells. Four units have open bay dormitories totaling 846 beds. One unit with 184 beds houses 92 Faith and Character inmates and 92 Incentive Inmates. The prison includes a 74-bed segregation unit and a 12-bed infirmary. This facility also houses an abbreviated diagnostic unit, and a tactical squad.

== Notable inmates ==
- Ashley Diamond, prison and LGBTQ rights activist
- Burrell Ellis, former CEO of DeKalb County, Georgia, convicted of perjury and sentenced to 5 years of probation and 18 months in prison on July 8, 2015.
