= Wheeler Correctional Facility =

Prison in Georgia, United States

Coordinates: 32°09′00″N 82°47′43″W

- Interactive map of Wheeler Correctional Facility
- Location: 195 N Broad Street Alamo, Georgia
- Status: open
- Security class: medium security
- Capacity: 2,874
- Opened: 1998
- Managed by: CoreCivic

Wheeler Correctional Facility is a medium-security prison for men, owned and operated by CoreCivic under contract with the Georgia Department of Corrections. It was built in 1998 in Alamo, Wheeler County, Georgia, with a maximum capacity of 2,874 inmates.
