= Smith State Prison =

Prison in Glennville, Georgia, United States

Coordinates: 31°58′23″N 81°54′58″W

- Interactive map of Smith State Prison
- Location: 9676 US-301 Glennville, Georgia
- Status: open
- Security class: close security
- Capacity: 1615
- Opened: 1993
- Managed by: Georgia Department of Corrections

Smith State Prison is a Georgia Department of Corrections state prison for men located in Glennville, Tattnall County, Georgia.

The facility opened in 1993, and has a maximum capacity of 1615 inmates held at close security level.

== Notable Inmates ==
- Christopher Sean Bowers
