= Phillips State Prison =

Prison in Georgia, United States

Coordinates: 34°05′39″N 83°54′38″W

- Interactive map of Phillips State Prison
- Location: 2989 West Rock Quarry Road Buford, Georgia
- Status: open
- Security class: medium
- Capacity: 918
- Opened: 1990
- Managed by: Georgia Department of Corrections

Phillips State Prison is a Georgia Department of Corrections state medium-security prison for men located in Buford, Gwinnett County, Georgia. Current capacity of the facility is 918 inmates.

== History ==
In 2006, a campus of the New Orleans Baptist Theological Seminary was established in the penitentiary.

Phillips was one of nine Georgia state prisons implicated in an FBI sting operation announced in February 2016. The agency indicted 47 correction officers who had agreed to deliver illegal drugs while in uniform. These charges were "part of a larger public corruption investigation into Georgia Correctional Facilities".
