= Jenkins Correctional Facility =

Prison in Georgia, United States

Coordinates: 32°47′23″N 81°55′29″W

- Interactive map of Jenkins Correctional Facility
- Location: 3404 Parker Estates Drive Millen, Georgia
- Status: open
- Security class: medium security
- Capacity: 1150
- Opened: 2012
- Managed by: Corrections Corporation of America

Jenkins Correctional Facility is a privately operated, medium-security prison for men, owned and operated by CoreCivic under contract with the Georgia Department of Corrections. The facility was built in 2012 in Millen, Jenkins County, Georgia.

The maximum capacity of the prison is 1150 inmates.
