= Augusta State Medical Prison =

Prison in Georgia, United States

Coordinates: 33°25′55″N 82°11′17″W

- Interactive map of Augusta State Medical Prison
- Location: 3001 Gordon Highway Grovetown, Georgia
- Status: open
- Security class: close
- Capacity: 1326
- Opened: 1983
- Managed by: Georgia Department of Corrections

Augusta State Medical Prison is located in Grovetown on the County lines of Columbia County and Richmond County in Georgia, United States. It houses male and rarely female inmates; the capacity is 1326. It was constructed in 1982 and opened in 1983. It is a Close Security Prison. Augusta was one of the 7 prisons involved in the 2010 Georgia prison strike.

== Notable Inmates ==
=== Current ===
- Hemy Neuman - Murdered Rusty Sneiderman in November 2010 in the parking lot of his son's preschool while dropping him off.
- Gregory Johns McMichael - One out of three men convicted in the Murder of Ahmaud Arbery.

=== Former ===
- Sidney Dorsey - Former sheriff of DeKalb County, Georgia who ordered the killing of Derwin Brown in 2000, after losing the election to him. Died March 2026.
