= Valdosta State Prison =

State prison in Valdosta, Georgia, USA

Coordinates: 30°51′30″N 83°20′42″W

- Interactive map of Valdosta State Prison
- Location: 3259 Val Tech Road Valdosta, Georgia
- Status: open
- Security class: close security
- Capacity: 1312
- Opened: 1959; renovated 1989
- Managed by: Georgia Department of Corrections

Valdosta State Prison is a Georgia Department of Corrections state prison for men located in Valdosta, Lowndes County, Georgia.

The facility first opened in 1959, and has a maximum capacity of 1312 inmates held at close security level.

== Notable Inmates ==
- Ashley Diamond - prison and LGBTQ rights activist
- Guy Heinze Jr. - Mass Murderer. Sentenced to life without the possibility of parole for killing his father and seven members of his extended family.
- William Bryan Jr. - One out of three men convicted in the Murder of Ahmaud Arbery.
