= Bostick State Prison =

Former prison in Georgia, United States

Coordinates: 33°02′31″N 83°13′11″W

Bostick State Prison is a former prison located in Hardwick in Baldwin County, Georgia. It was constructed in the 1950s and converted to a prison in 1987. It closed in May 2010.

== Notable inmates ==
Notable inmates of the prison include:

- Alvin Neelley - convicted murderer
