= Tift College =

Women's college in Forsyth, Georgia, US (1849–1987)

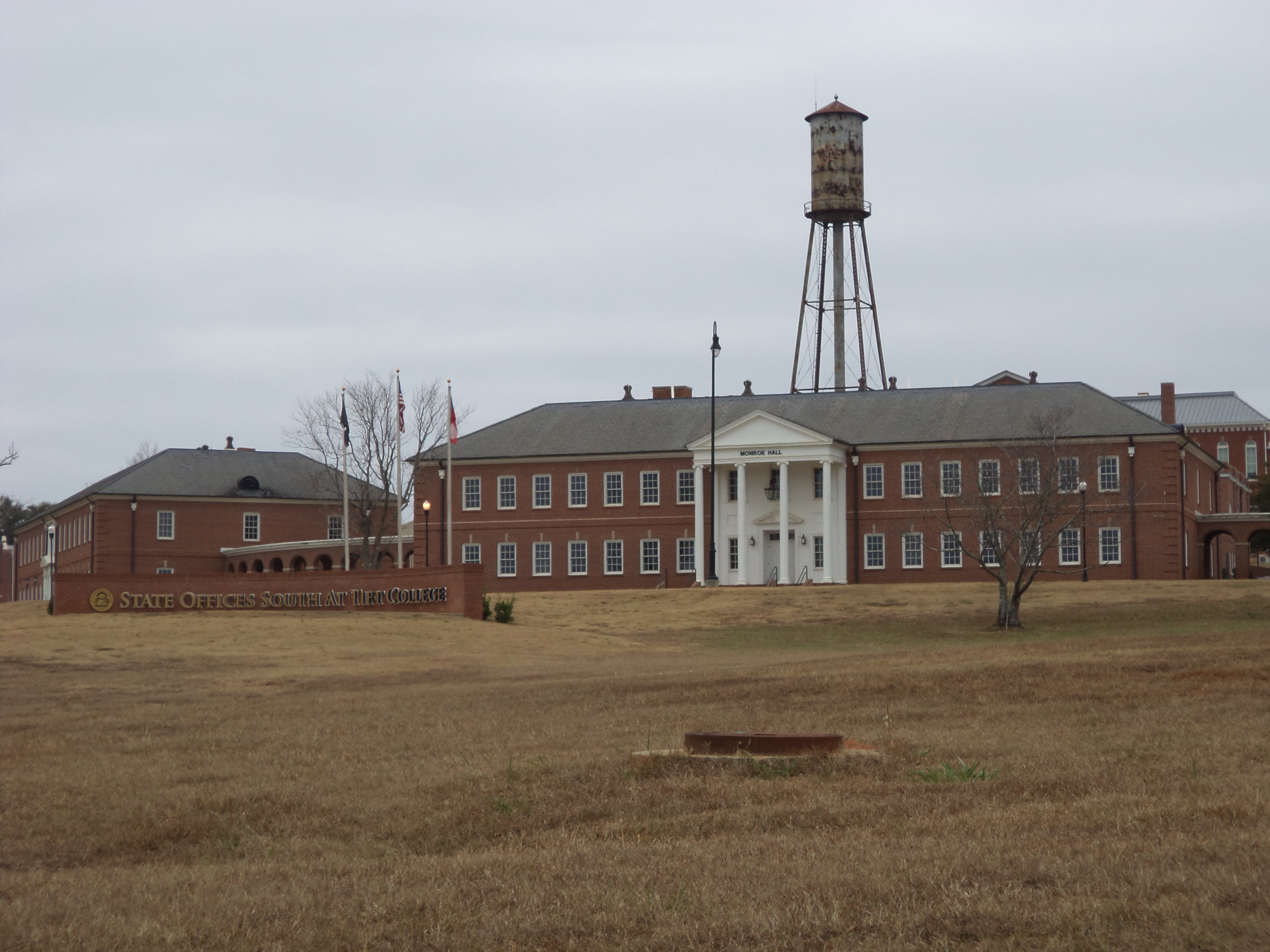
- Monroe Hall
- Former names: Forsyth Female Collegiate Institute (1849-1857); Monroe College (1857-1907); Bessie Tift College (1907-1956)
- Active: 1849–1987
- Affiliations: Georgia Baptist Convention
- Academic affiliations: Mercer University
- Endowment: $6.2 million
- Students: 191 (class of 1986)
- Location: Tift College Drive, Forsyth, Georgia, 31029, United States

Tift College was a private liberal arts women's college located in Forsyth, Georgia. Due to a decline in enrollment over the years, the college merged with Mercer University, in nearby Macon, Georgia, in June 1986.

The campus facilities have been adapted for use as the headquarters of the Georgia Department of Corrections. The facility is known as State Offices South at Tift College (SOSTC). The 275-acre (1.11 km^{2}) campus is 20 miles north of Macon.

== History ==
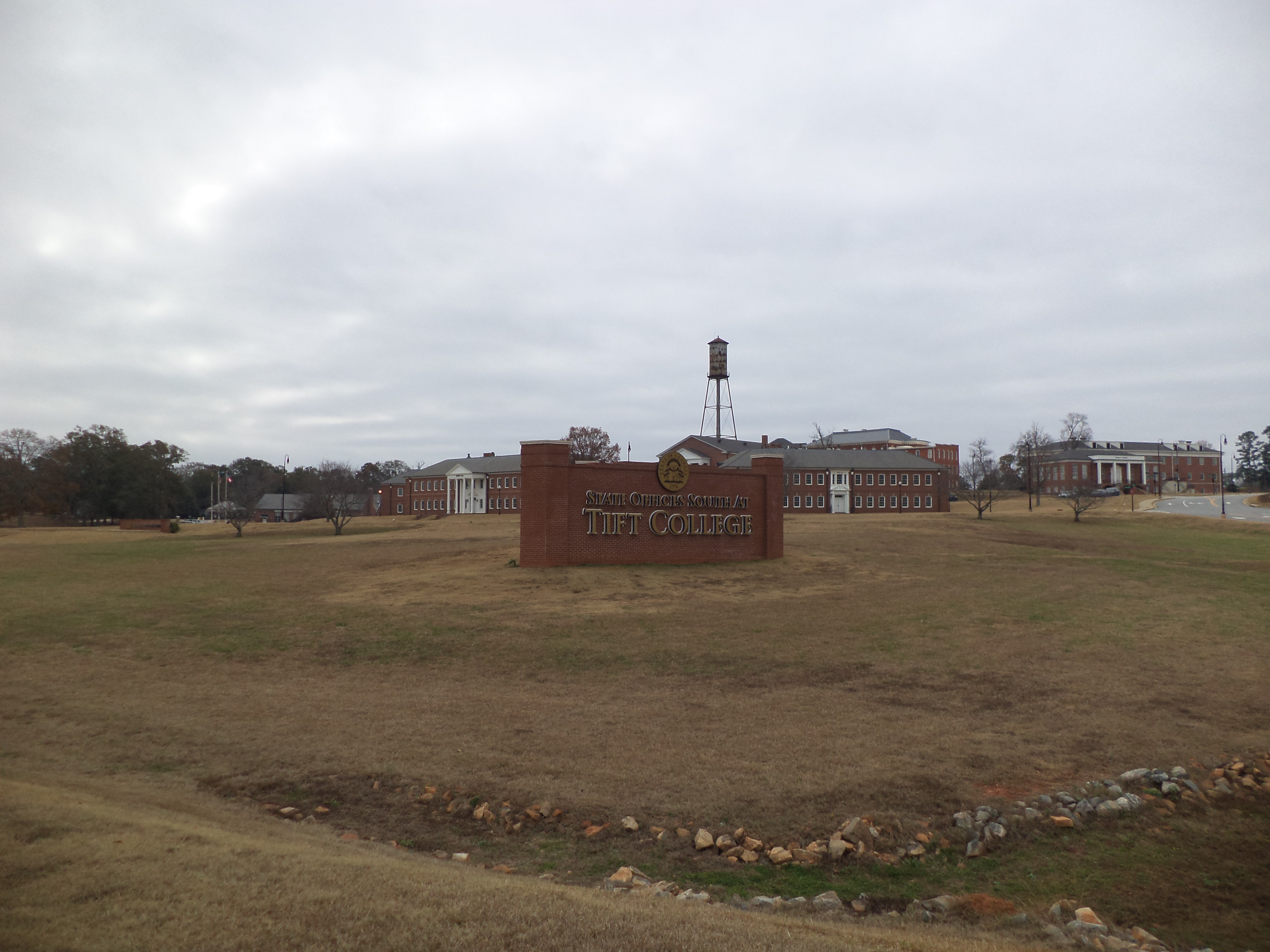
State Offices South at Tift College

The college was founded in 1849 as Forsyth Female Collegiate Institute. In 1857 it was renamed Monroe College, the name was changed again to Bessie Tift College in 1907 in honor of alumna Bessie Willingham Tift. This name was shortened to Tift College in 1956.

During the Great Depression, the college faced closure and faculty took a 70 percent pay cut to keep it open.

In 1957, a plaque was placed on campus that recounted the history of the college, and is located at the intersection of Tift College Drive and Dungan Street in Forsyth.

Tift College merged with Mercer University in June 1986. The final class numbered 191 students, and the endowment was $6.2 million. Mercer and the Tift College Alumnae Association joined together to form a partnership to preserve the legacy of Tift College. In 1987 the college was closed by Mercer. The Mercer University Board of Trustees voted to change the name of its School of Education to the Tift College of Education to carry on the educational legacy of Tift College.

Over the years, Mercer has continued to maintain the heritage, identity and ideals of Tift College, most notably through the Tift College Scholars Program. The program honors a select group of young women at Mercer with scholarships and inclusion in one of the university's most distinguished scholastic organizations.

In 2006, the governor announced plans to use the Forsyth campus for the headquarters of the Georgia Department of Corrections. After renovation of buildings for this purpose, the move took place in 2010.

== Legacy and honors ==
- Tift College of Education at Mercer University
- Tift College Scholars Program, for young women

== See also ==
- List of colleges and universities in Georgia
- List of current and historical women's universities and colleges
- List of coordinate colleges
