= Metro State Prison =

Former place in Georgia, United States

Coordinates: 33.686886°N 84.335339°W

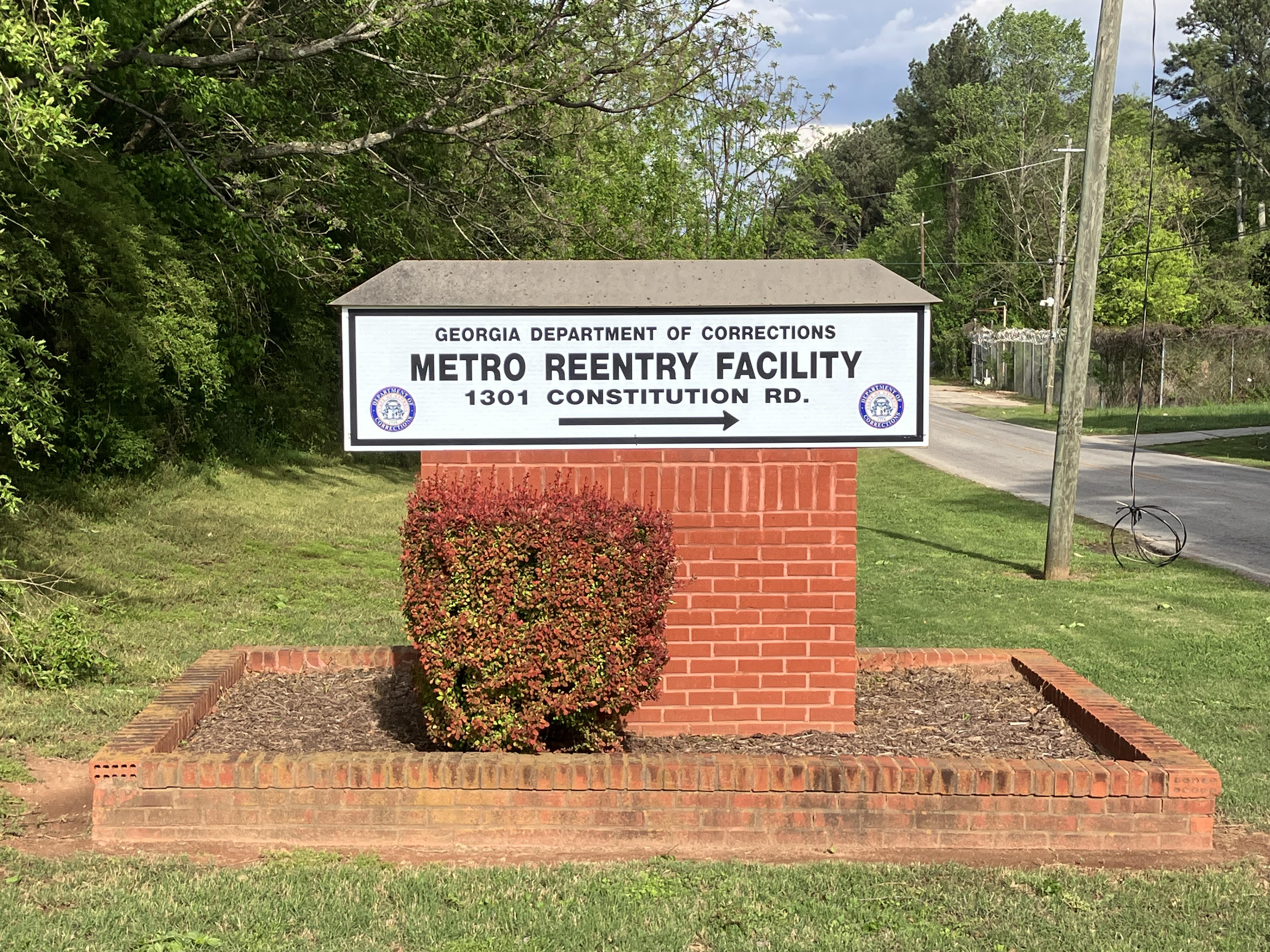
Metro Reentry Facility Sign (April 2025)

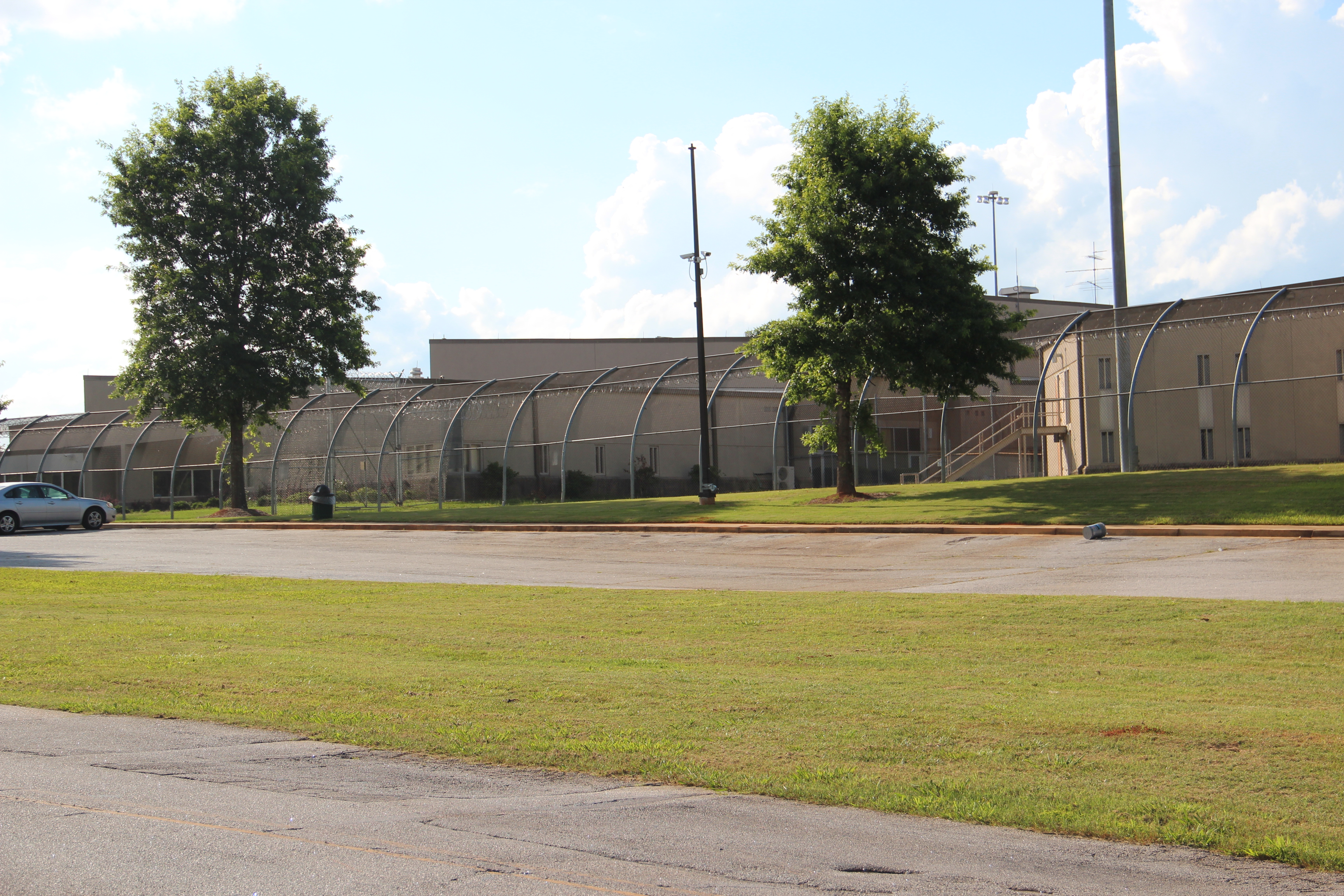
Buildings at Metro State Prison

Metro State Prison, previously the Metro Correctional Institution, is an American former Georgia Department of Corrections prison for women in unincorporated southern DeKalb County, Georgia, near Atlanta. Female death row inmates (UDS, "under death sentence") were held in the Metro State Prison. The prison had room for 779 prisoners. It was closed in 2011. In 2018, the prison was renovated and reopened as the Metro Reentry Facility.

== History ==
Metro State opened in 1980 as a men's prison. In 1993 the male prisoners were moved out of Metro and were replaced with prisoners from the Georgia Women's Correctional Institution. The prison planned to move the 700 male prisoners at Metro to other prisons. The swap was scheduled for completion on July 1, 1993. As the transfer occurred the prison was the only co-ed prison in the State of Georgia. Georgia DOC officials said that the gender swap occurred because many female prisoners were from Greater Atlanta and the proximity would provide more opportunities for family members to visit them. In addition, the location allowed female prisoners to have more access to psychological and medical services available in Greater Atlanta. Lynn Cook of the Atlanta Journal-Constitution said "[t]he swap also made [sic] to get the female inmates out of a culture at Georgia Women’s Correctional Institution that had allowed officers and other workers at the prison to engage in sexual relationships with inmates."

In 2011 the State of Georgia closed the prison. The women were moved to Lee Arrendale State Prison and Pulaski State Prison. Georgia DOC officials declined to state when the agency began moving the prisoners or when the move had been completed, citing security concerns. The inmates and employees had been cleared out of the prison by April 30, 2011. Brian Owens, the Commissioner, stated in 2011 to members of the Georgia Legislature that the number of women coming into the Georgia DOC system had declined even though the overall prison population had increased. In January 2011 Owens said that a private prison company may have expressed an interest in buying the prison. In April 2011 a spokesperson for the Georgia DOC said that the state had no plans for the facility. At the time of the closure the prison had 319 employees. The state offered them transfers to other prisons.

After renovation, the facility reopened in 2018 as the Metro Reentry Facility.

== Notable prisoners ==
Non-death row

- Lynn Turner (died in prison)

Death row

- Kelly Gissendaner
