= Wicked Attraction =

American true crime TV series (2008–2013)

- Genre: Docudrama
- Country of origin: United States
- Original language: English
- No. of seasons: 6
- No. of episodes: 79

Production
- Running time: 60 minutes (with commercials)
- Production company: M2 Pictures

Original release
- Network: Investigation Discovery
- Release: August 7, 2008 – October 10, 2013

Wicked Attraction (broadcast in some countries as Couples Who Kill) is an American true crime television series on Investigation Discovery which began airing in the United States in 2008. The series focuses on how two seemingly ordinary people can come together to commit heinous crimes, thereby forming a "wicked attraction." The series was cancelled in 2013, after its sixth season.

== Synopsis ==
Wicked Attraction uses some of the world's leading criminal psychologists to explore couples who kill by delving into the minds of some of the most infamous criminals in history. It seeks to explain how murdering duos find each other, how they select their victims, and what motivates them. Each hour of Wicked Attraction features one case, and takes the audience through the twists and turns of the killers' deadly relationship and law enforcement's investigation and arrest of each murdering couple.
