= Sidney Dorsey =

American sheriff and murderer (1940–2026)

- Born: February 23, 1940; Atlanta, Georgia, US
- Died: March 2, 2026 (aged 86); Augusta State Medical Prison, Grovetown, Georgia, US
- Occupations: Law enforcement official, first African-American sheriff of DeKalb County, Georgia, 1996–2000
- Spouse: Sherry Dorsey
- Motive: Rivalry
- Convictions: Murder; Racketeering (2 counts); Violation of oath by a public officer Theft (8 counts)
- Penalty: Life imprisonment

Details
- Victims: Sheriff-elect Derwin Brown
- Date: December 15, 2000
- Country: United States
- State: Georgia

Sidney Dorsey (February 23, 1940 – March 2, 2026) was an American law enforcement officer who served as the first African American sheriff of DeKalb County, Georgia, from 1996 to 2000. After Dorsey lost a 2000 runoff election to challenger Derwin Brown, he arranged to have Brown murdered. Dorsey was sentenced to life in prison for the murder.

== Early life, family and education ==
Dorsey was born in a deeply segregated area of Atlanta. During some of his early years he grew up in New York before returning to Atlanta to complete his education in Washington high school and build up his career as a police officer and detective.

His time in Washington high school is not well documented.

== Career ==
Dorsey's career culminated with his election to Sheriff of DeKalb County, Georgia; he served from 1996 to 2000.

=== Atlanta Child Murders Task Force ===
Prior to 1996, Dorsey served on the task force that looked into reopening the case of convicted murderer Wayne Williams. Dorsey appeared as one of many who voiced public doubt of Williams's guilt, including some of the victims' relatives. Dorsey is quoted as stating: "Most people who are aware of the child murders believe as I do that Wayne Williams did not commit these crimes." Williams was identified as the key suspect in the Atlanta Child Murders that occurred between 1979 and 1981. In January 1982, Williams was found guilty of the murder of two adult men.

== Murder of Derwin Brown ==
On the evening of December 15, 2000, police captain Derwin Brown, who defeated Dorsey that November in the election for county sheriff, was murdered at his home in Decatur, Georgia. On July 10, 2002, Dorsey was convicted of ordering Brown's assassination in order to obstruct Brown's expected probe into corruption occurring in the DeKalb County sheriff's office during Dorsey's term.

Superior Court Judge Cynthia Becker sentenced Dorsey to life in prison for the murder conviction, an additional 23 years on racketeering and violation of oath of office convictions, and concurrent sentences ranging from 10 to 15 years for several convictions of theft by taking of the oath of office of an elected official. Dorsey was previously held at Georgia Diagnostic and Classification State Prison and was transferred to Augusta State Medical Prison. Two of the men hired to murder Brown, Melvin Walker and David Ramsey, were acquitted of the murder in state court. In 2005, both were found guilty in federal court of conspiracy to commit interstate murder for hire, and sentenced to life in prison without parole.

In 2007, it was reported that Dorsey confessed to his part in ordering the assassination out of bitterness for his defeat in the sheriff's election. He claimed he had attempted to abort the assassination plot before Brown's murder but was unsuccessful.

== Personal life and death ==
Dorsey was married to Sherry Dorsey, a former Atlanta Councilwoman.

He died at age 86 while incarcerated at Augusta State Medical Prison on March 2, 2026.
