= Bulloch County Correctional Institution =

Prison in Georgia, United States

Coordinates: 32.46677°N 81.76706°W

Bulloch County Correctional Institution is located in Statesboro, Georgia, United States. The facility houses Adult Male Felons with a capacity of 132. It was constructed in 1942 and opened in 1945. It was renovated in 1989. It is a Medium security prison.
