= Colquitt County Prison =

Prison in Moultrie, Georgia, United States

Coordinates: 31.129628°N 83.708689°W

Colquitt County Correctional Institution (formerly Colquitt County Prison) is a medium security prison in Moultrie, in Colquitt County, Georgia. The facility houses adult male felons; it has a capacity is 190. It was constructed in 1954 and opened in 1955. It was renovated in 1989.
