= Washington Correctional Institution =

Washington Correctional Institution may refer to:

- Northwest Florida Reception Center, a men's prison in Washington County, Florida
- Washington State Penitentiary, a men's prison in Walla Walla, Washington
- Washington State Prison, a men's prison in Davisboro, Georgia
