= Dodge State Prison =

Prison in Georgia, United States

Coordinates: 32°23′37″N 83°10′04″W

- Interactive map of Dodge State Prison
- Location: 2971 Old Bethel Church Road Chester, Georgia, United States
- Status: open
- Security class: medium
- Capacity: 1236
- Opened: 1983; expanded 1989
- Managed by: Georgia Department of Corrections

Dodge State Prison is a Georgia Department of Corrections state medium-security prison for men located in Chester, Dodge County, Georgia. Current capacity of the facility is 1236 inmates.

Dodge was one of nine Georgia state prisons implicated in an FBI sting operation announced in February 2016. The agency indicted 47 correction officers from multiple facilities who'd agreed to deliver illegal drugs while in uniform. These charges were "part of a larger public corruption investigation into Georgia Correctional Facilities".
