= Derwin Brown =

American politician (1954–2000)

- Born: June 22, 1954; Fort Knox, Kentucky, U.S.
- Died: December 15, 2000 (aged 46); Decatur, Georgia, U.S.
- Cause of death: Assassination by gunshot
- Occupations: Law enforcement officer, politician
- Years active: 1977–2000
- Spouse: Phyllis Brown (died 2006)
- Children: Brandy Brown-Rhodes, Robert Brown, Michael Brown, Maurice Douglas (died January 6, 2012), and Marlon Robinson

Derwin Brown (June 22, 1954 – December 15, 2000) was an American police captain and the sheriff-elect of DeKalb County, Georgia, who was assassinated on the evening of December 15, 2000, on the orders of defeated rival Sidney Dorsey.

== Early life ==
Derwin Brown was born on June 22, 1954, at Fort Knox, Kentucky, the eldest child of Burvena and George Robert Brown. He was raised in Long Island, New York, where he attended Woodfield Road School, Malverne Junior High School, and Malverne High School.

== Career ==
Brown first served DeKalb County, Georgia as a youth counselor for troubled teens and soon became one of the county's first black patrol officers. He later hosted his own local TV segment called The Naked Truth and was the author of his own column in the local Champion News Paper called "Tell It Like It Is." Brown was a 23-year veteran of the DeKalb County Police Department when he was elected to the position of Sheriff on a platform of cleaning up the corruption and graft that had historically troubled the DeKalb County Sheriff's Office.

== Assassination ==
On December 15, 2000, former sheriff's deputy Melvin Walker shot Brown twelve times with a TEC-9 handgun in front of his home in Decatur. Brown was murdered only three days before he was due to be sworn in as sheriff; DeKalb County Director of Public Safety Thomas Brown assumed control of the post in an interim fashion pending a special election to be held in March 2001.

At trial, prosecutors alleged that then-DeKalb County Sheriff Sidney Dorsey – whom Brown had recently defeated in the election – had promised Walker a promotion to deputy sheriff if he killed Brown and that David Ramsey, the backup shooter and getaway driver, was promised a job as a detention officer. Dorsey was convicted of ordering Brown's assassination. Details that came to light during the trial suggested that Dorsey ordered the killing to obstruct an expected probe into corruption during his tenure as sheriff.

The Brown family filed suit against those involved in the killing. After a civil trial found the defendants liable, the family was awarded a judgment of $776 million. The defense attorneys declined to appear on behalf of the defendants at trial; instead, having filed an interlocutory appeal on the issue of liability, they allowed the damages portion of the trial to go forward undefended. The Georgia Court of Appeals ruled in the defendant's favor on the issue of whether the state was immune from suit. The plaintiff appealed the ruling up to the Supreme Court of Georgia, which upheld the ruling. The Supreme Court of the United States denied certiorari on a subsequent appeal filed by Brown's family. After the verdict was rendered virtually uncollectable by the series of failed appeals, a bill was introduced into the Georgia House of Representatives seeking to compensate Brown's family in excess of $300 million. The bill failed to obtain the necessary votes for passage.

On July 13, 2007, Dorsey confessed to investigators that he had ordered Deputy Patrick Cuffy to carry out the killing. However, he claimed he had tried to call off the assassination attempt prior to Brown's murder.

== Legacy ==
Brown had five children and 12 grandchildren. His wife, Phyllis Brown, died on Christmas Eve in 2006 of heart failure after suffering a debilitating stroke, nine days after leading a candlelight vigil commemorating the anniversary of her husband's murder.

Brown was a member of Omega Psi Phi fraternity. He was also a member of Freemasonry and a Masonic Lodge was named in his honor, the Derwin Brown Masonic Lodge #599 PHA.

Brown's assassination was featured on Investigation Discovery's series Fatal Encounters, season 1, episode 9, "Who Shot the Sheriff?" The assassination and case were also featured on Oxygen's series Deadly Power, season 1, episode 3, "Above the Law".

DeKalb County has named a police precinct near South DeKalb Mall after Brown, and has also renamed Glasgow Drive to "Derwin Brown Drive" in honor of the slain sheriff-elect.
