= Chester, Georgia =

- Town
- Location in Dodge County and the state of Georgia
- Coordinates: 32°23′42″N 83°9′13″W
- Country: United States
- State: Georgia
- County: Dodge
- Incorporated (town): 1912

Area
  - Total: 0.88 sq mi (2.29 km^{2})
  - Land: 0.88 sq mi (2.28 km^{2})
  - Water: 0.0039 sq mi (0.01 km^{2})
- Elevation: 367 ft (112 m)

Population (2020)
  - Total: 525
  - Density: 596.2/sq mi (230.21/km^{2})
- Time zone: UTC-5 (Eastern (EST))
  - Summer (DST): UTC-4 (EDT)
- ZIP code: 31012
- Area code: 478
- FIPS code: 13-15900
- GNIS feature ID: 0331384

Chester is a town in Dodge County, Georgia, United States. The population was 1,596 at the 2010 census, up from 305 in 2000, due to inclusion of Dodge State Prison within the town limits. By 2020, its township population was 525.

== History ==
The town takes its name from Chester, New York. The Georgia General Assembly incorporated the place in 1902 as the "Town of Chester", with municipal corporate limits extending in a one-mile radius from the Wrightsville and Tennille Railroad depot.

== Geography ==
Chester is located in northern Dodge County at 32°23′42″N 83°9′13″W (32.394965, -83.153610). Georgia State Route 126 passes through the town as Main Street, leading west 13 miles (21 km) to Cochran and southeast 8 miles (13 km) to Cadwell. Georgia State Route 257 joins SR 126 on Main Street through the center of Chester, but leads northeast 7 miles (11 km) to Dexter and southwest 9 miles (14 km) to Empire. Eastman, the Dodge County seat, is 15 miles (24 km) to the south via Chester Highway.

According to the United States Census Bureau, Chester has a total area of 0.89 square miles (2.3 km^{2}), all land.

== Demographics ==
Historical population
Census	Pop.	Note	%±
1910	278		—
1920	397		42.8%
1930	267		−32.7%
1940	281		5.2%
1950	315		12.1%
1960	377		19.7%
1970	409		8.5%
1980	409		0.0%
1990	1,072		162.1%
2000	305		−71.5%
2010	1,596		423.3%
2020	525		−67.1%
U.S. Decennial Census

=== Racial and ethnic composition ===
Chester town, Georgia – Racial and ethnic composition Note: the US Census treats Hispanic/Latino as an ethnic category. This table excludes Latinos from the racial categories and assigns them to a separate category. Hispanics/Latinos may be of any race.
Race / Ethnicity (NH = Non-Hispanic)	Pop 2000	Pop 2010	Pop 2020	% 2000	% 2010	% 2020
White alone (NH)	165	606	190	54.10%	37.97%	36.19%
Black or African American alone (NH)	136	919	318	44.59%	57.58%	60.57%
Native American or Alaska Native alone (NH)	0	1	0	0.00%	0.06%	0.00%
Asian alone (NH)	0	3	2	0.00%	0.19%	0.38%
Native Hawaiian or Pacific Islander alone (NH)	0	1	0	0.00%	0.06%	0.00%
Other race alone (NH)	2	0	0	0.66%	0.00%	0.00%
Mixed race or Multiracial (NH)	2	8	5	0.66%	0.50%	0.95%
Hispanic or Latino (any race)	0	58	10	0.00%	3.63%	1.90%
Total	305	1,596	525	100.00%	100.00%	100.00%

=== 2020 census ===
As of the 2020 United States census, there were 525 people, 194 households, and 127 families residing in the town.
