= Long State Prison =

Prison in Georgia, United States

Coordinates: 31.7228°N 81.7250°W

Long State Prison is a medium security incarceration facility in Ludowici, Georgia, United States. It houses about 232 adult male offenders.
