= Hardwick, Baldwin County, Georgia =

- Unincorporated community Census-designated place
- Location in Baldwin County and the state of Georgia
- Coordinates: 33°3′9″N 83°14′14″W
- Country: United States
- State: Georgia
- County: Baldwin

Area
  - Total: 4.9 sq mi (12.6 km^{2})
  - Land: 4.9 sq mi (12.6 km^{2})
  - Water: 0 sq mi (0 km^{2})
- Elevation: 367 ft (112 m)

Population (2020)
  - Total: 3,513
- Time zone: UTC-5 (Eastern (EST))
  - Summer (DST): UTC-4 (EDT)
- Postal code: 31061
- Area code: 478
- FIPS code: 13-51394

Hardwick an unincorporated community and census-designated place (CDP) in Baldwin County, Georgia, is a part of the micropolitan statistical area. As of the 2020 census, its population stands at 3,513, reflecting a significant decrease from 5,135 in 2000 when it was known as Midway-Hardwick.

The community is built around Central State Hospital, once one of the largest mental health institutions in the United States. Hardwick is historically notable for being home to Oglethorpe University during the 19th century. Today, its ZIP code is 31034, connecting its rich history to its present-day identity.

== Geography ==
Hardwick is located at 33°3′9″N 83°14′14″W (33.052571, -83.237130). According to the United States Census Bureau, the CDP has a total area of 4.9 square miles (12.6 km^{2}), of which 0.012 square miles (0.03 km^{2}), or 0.20%, is water.

== Demographics ==
Historical population
Census	Pop.	Note	%±
1950	14,774		—
1960	16,909		14.5%
1970	14,047		−16.9%
1980	8,977		−36.1%
1990	4,910		−45.3%
2000	5,135		4.6%
2010	3,930		−23.5%
2020	3,513		−10.6%
U.S. Decennial Census; 1850-1870 1870-1880; 1890-1910 1920-1930; 1940 1950 1960; 1970 1980 1990; 2000 2010 2020

Hardwick, then known as Midway-Hardwick, was first listed as an unincorporated place in the 1950 U.S. census, and redesignated a census designated place in the 1980 U.S. census. It was renamed Hardwick CDP in the 2010 U.S. census.

=== Racial and ethnic composition ===
Hardwick CDP, Georgia – Racial and ethnic composition Note: the US Census treats Hispanic/Latino as an ethnic category. This table excludes Latinos from the racial categories and assigns them to a separate category. Hispanics/Latinos may be of any race.
Race / Ethnicity (NH = Non-Hispanic)	Pop 2000	Pop 2010	Pop 2020	% 2000	% 2010	% 2020
White alone (NH)	1,274	821	774	24.81%	20.89%	22.03%
Black or African American alone (NH)	3,713	2,987	2,542	72.31%	76.01%	72.36%
Native American or Alaska Native alone (NH)	21	4	2	0.41%	0.10%	0.06%
Asian alone (NH)	33	12	8	0.64%	0.31%	0.23%
Native Hawaiian or Pacific Islander alone (NH)	0	1	1	0.00%	0.03%	0.03%
Other race alone (NH)	11	1	16	0.21%	0.03%	0.46%
Mixed race or Multiracial (NH)	53	51	89	1.03%	1.30%	2.53%
Hispanic or Latino (any race)	30	53	81	0.58%	1.35%	2.31%
Total	5,135	3,930	3,513	100.00%	100.00%	100.00%

=== 2020 census ===
As of the 2020 United States census, there were 3,513 people, 1,401 households, and 648 families residing in the CDP.

== Government and infrastructure ==
Baldwin State Prison (previously Georgia Women's Correctional Institution) of the Georgia Department of Corrections is located in Milledgeville, near Hardwick.

== Notable person ==
- William Usery, Jr., United States Secretary of Labor (1976–1977)
