= Pulaski State Prison =

Women's prison in Georgia, USA

Coordinates: 32°18′41″N 83°27′25″W

- Interactive map of Pulaski State Prison
- Location: 373 Upper River Road Hawkinsville, Georgia
- Status: open
- Security class: medium
- Capacity: 1223
- Opened: 1994
- Managed by: Georgia Department of Corrections

Pulaski State Prison (PSP) is a Georgia Department of Corrections prison for women located in Hawkinsville, Georgia. It consists of 13 buildings with 48 double-bunk rooms. The facility opened in 1994.

== History ==
Around the period 2005–2015, multiple prisoners at Pulaski died after being treated by Dr. Yvon Nazaire. The State of Georgia hired Dr. Nazaire even though several patient deaths and accusations of malpractice occurred while he was in New York. Reports in the Atlanta Journal-Constitution listed at least 22 inmates who died under Dr. Nazaire's care—15 of them in Pulaski, five after being released from Pulaski, and another two at Georgia's Emanuel Women's Facility when Nazaire served there briefly. The doctor was subsequently fired by the DOC for lying about his qualifications, and put under investigation by the Georgia Bureau of Investigation.

Pulaski was one of nine Georgia state prisons implicated in an FBI sting operation announced in February 2016. The agency indicted 47 corrections staff of different GDC facilities who'd agreed to deliver illegal drugs while in uniform. These charges were "part of a larger public corruption investigation into Georgia Correctional Facilities".
