= Georgia Department of Corrections =

State prison operating agency

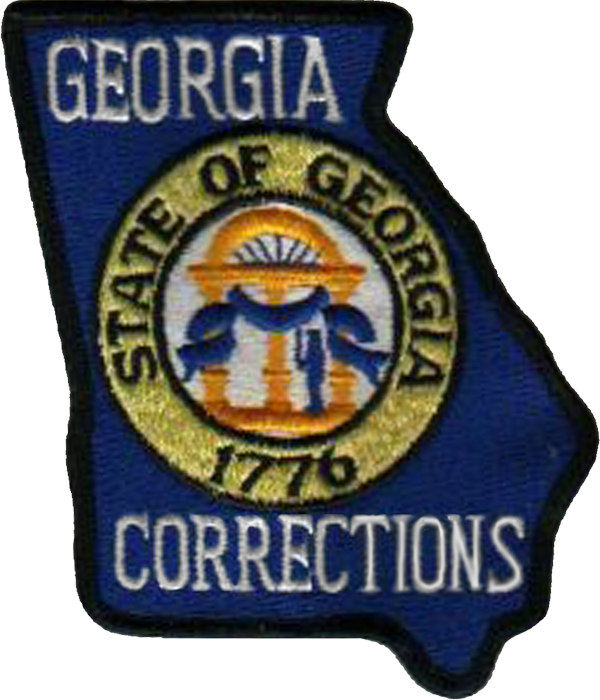
- To protect Georgians by operating secure facilities and providing opportunities for offender rehabilitation.

- Abbreviation: GDC

Agency overview
- Formed: 1969
- Employees: 9,000 (2026)
- Annual budget: USD 1.62 billion (FY 2026)

Jurisdictional structure
- Operations jurisdiction: Georgia, US
- Map of Georgia Department of Corrections's jurisdiction
- General nature: Civilian police

Operational structure
- Headquarters: State Offices South at Tift College; Forsyth, Georgia
- Agency executive: Tyrone Oliver, Commissioner

Facilities
- State prisons: 35

Website
- gdc.georgia.gov

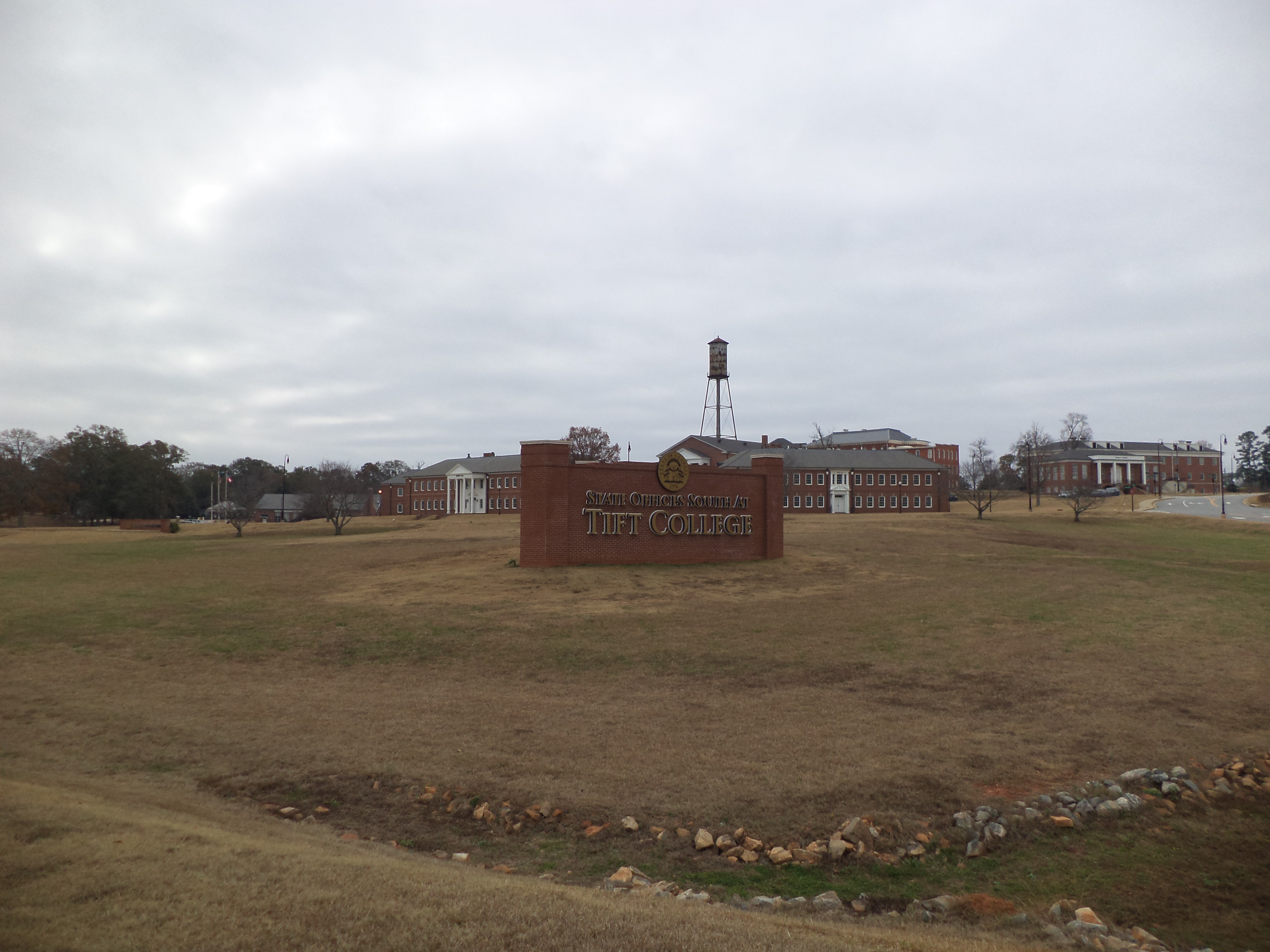
State Offices South at Tift College, where the department is headquartered

The Georgia Department of Corrections (GDC) is an agency of the U.S. state of Georgia operating state prisons. The agency is headquartered in Forsyth, on the former campus of Tift College.

== Headquarters ==
The GDC has its offices in Gibson Hall, located in the State Offices South at Tift College in Forsyth, Georgia.

Until 2009, the Georgia Department of Corrections headquarters was in the James H. "Sloppy" Floyd Veterans Memorial Building in Atlanta. In 2006, Governor Sonny Perdue announced that the agency planned to move its headquarters to Tift College by 2009. The state estimated that the relocation would bring around 400 jobs to Forsyth.

A 2007 employee survey indicated that 49% of the headquarters staff who responded to the survey planned to move with the agency and continue employment at the new headquarters. The agency planned to relocate to the former Tift College by 2010. The ordered relocation was to take place in September of that year.

Five GDOC offices in Atlanta merged into one facility in Tift. After the move was announced in 2006, many employees have moved south of Atlanta, and as of 2010 increasing numbers of employees who live on the south side of Atlanta were hired. Some employees left GDOC for other jobs after the move was announced. Four years of planning and $45 million funded the move. The Georgia Corrections Academy moved to Tift in Fall 2009. In September 2010 the administration began to move into Tift. Employees will reverse commute to Forsyth instead of commuting with traffic into Downtown Atlanta.

The 43 acres (17 ha) Tift College campus is visible from Interstate 75. Part of the Tift College property will be used as the GDC headquarters, and a part is used as the Georgia Corrections Academy.

The State of Georgia stated that the move will occur because the Atlanta location "does not facilitate effective Command & Control." There are 92 GDC facilities in the vicinity of Macon/South, while there are 27 GDC facilities in the vicinity of Atlanta/North. There are 35 state prisons in the vicinity of Macon/South and there are five state prisons in the vicinity of Atlanta/North. The agency stated "Elimination of regional offices accentuates need to be in central GA." In addition, five previous GDC Atlanta offices would be consolidated into one new location; according to GDC this will cause more efficient operations. The moving of the headquarters would cause 80,000 square feet (7,400 m^{2}) of space to become available in the Twin Towers complex in Atlanta.

The agency considered placing its headquarters on the property of the Georgia Diagnostic and Classification Prison (GDCP) in unincorporated Butts County, near Jackson. Other potential headquarters sites included another site in Forsyth, Macon, areas around Macon, Centerville, and the area near Warner Robins.

== Facilities ==
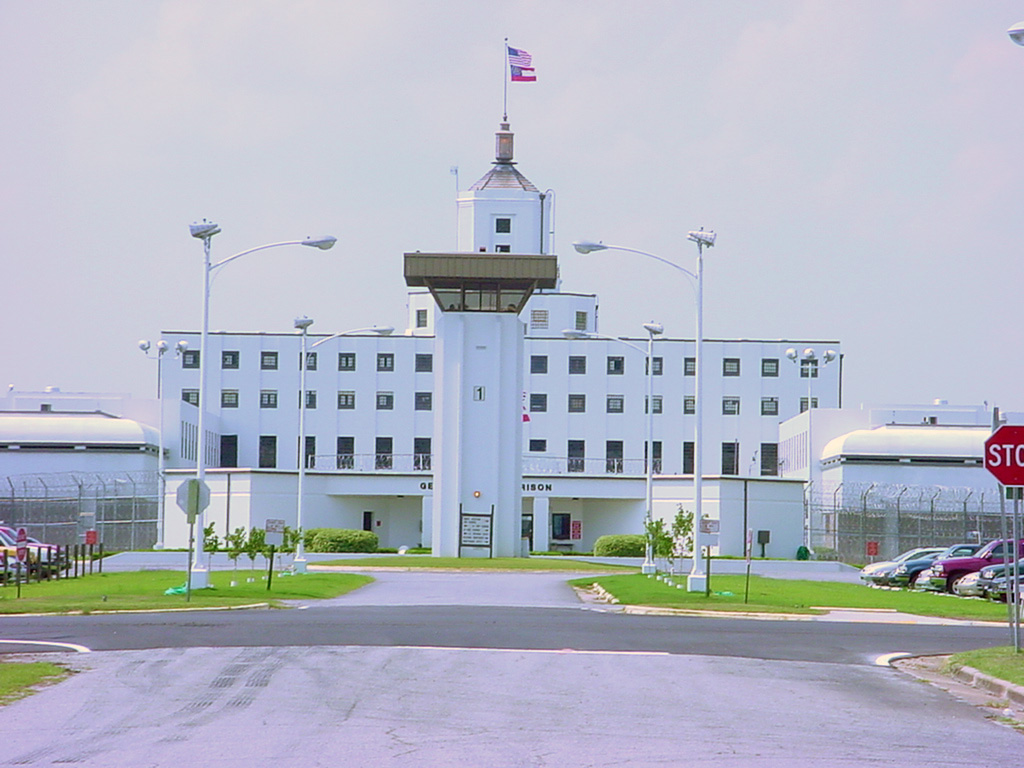
Georgia State Prison

== Death row ==
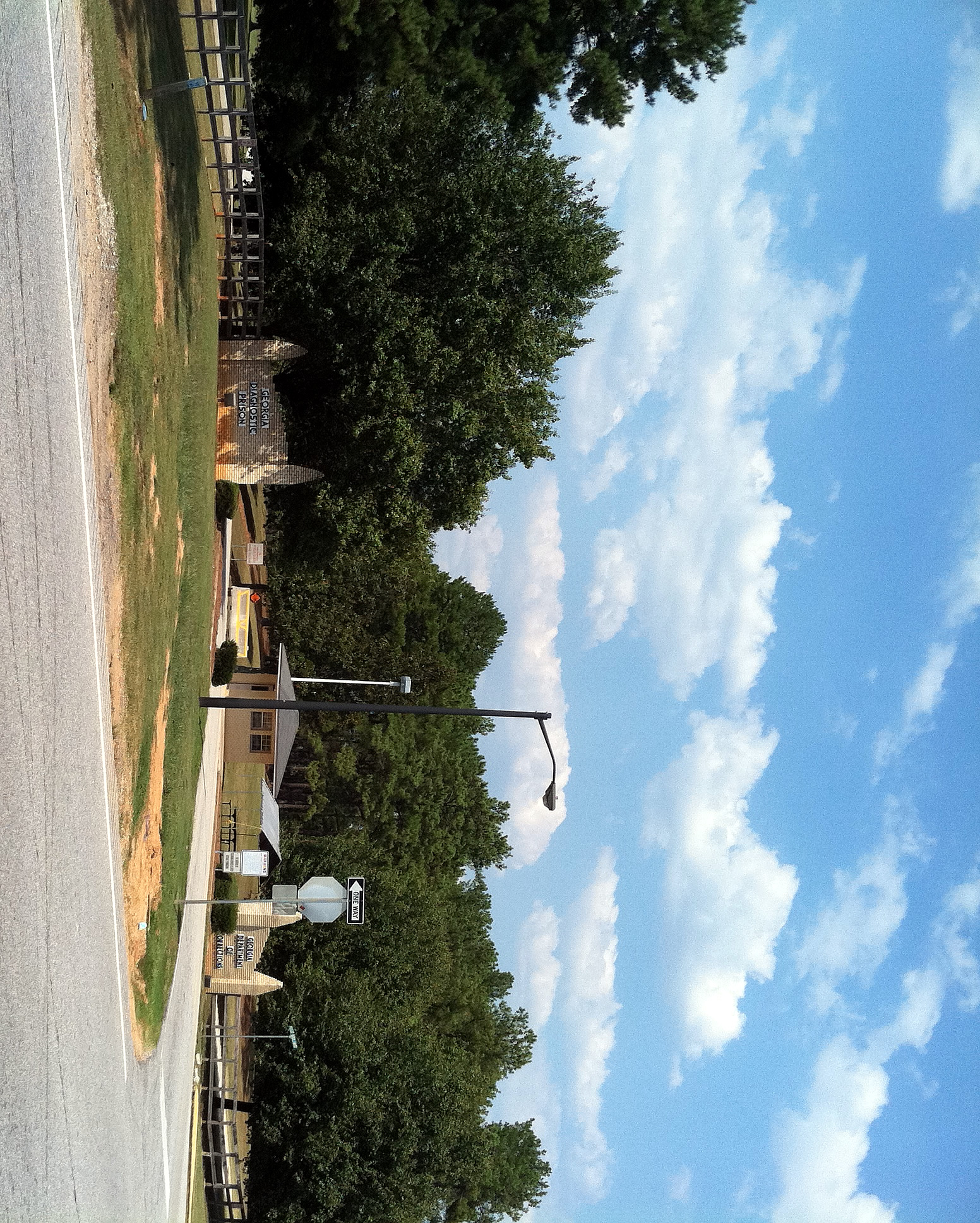
Georgia Diagnostic and Classification State Prison, which houses the death row for men and the state execution chamber

The state's death row for men is in the Georgia Diagnostic and Classification Prison (GDCP) in Butts County, Georgia. The death row for women is located in the Arrendale State Prison. GDCP houses the state's execution chamber.

From 1735 until 1924, persons condemned to death were hanged by the sheriff of the county or judicial circuit where the crime occurred. Over 500 of such hangings had occurred. The Georgia General Assembly passed a law on August 16, 1924, that abolished hanging for all capital crimes. Instead the condemned were to be electrocuted at the old Georgia State Prison at Milledgeville. During that year an electric chair was installed in the prison, and the first execution by that method was that of Howard Hinton, a man convicted of rape and robbery, on September 13, 1924.

On January 1, 1938, the site of the execution chamber relocated to the newly built Georgia State Prison at Reidsville; the first electrocution at the Georgia State Prison was that of Archie Haywood on May 6, 1938, and the last to take place was that of Bernard Dye on October 16, 1964, after which commenced an unofficial moratorium on executions in the state, culminating in the U.S. Supreme Court's Furman v. Georgia decision in 1972, which prompted an official suspension of capital punishment nationwide and a nullification of states' original death penalty laws, requiring every state to commute all death sentences and rewrite their laws. The State of Georgia passed a rewritten death penalty law in 1973. In 1976 the U.S. Supreme Court ruled that the Georgia death penalty law was constitutional.

In June 1980, the state's execution chamber was relocated to GDCP; in 1983, a new, smaller electric chair was installed in place of the original one. The original chair was put on display at the Georgia State Prison. On December 15, 1983, the first execution at GDCP, that of John Eldon Smith, occurred. In 2000 the Georgia government signed HB 1284 into law, which changed the method of execution to lethal injection, effective May 1, 2000. The first lethal injection execution occurred in October 2001.

The Georgia Department of Corrections stated in its 1999 annual report that "Typically, all Georgia death row inmates are males" and are housed at the GDCP. In November 1998 Kelly Gissendaner, a woman, was given a death sentence and was housed in the Metro State Prison. She was the first woman to reside on death row since 1992, when Janice Buttram's sentence was commuted to a life sentence. Buttram had been housed at the Middle Georgia Correctional Institution Women's Unit. The death row for women remained at the Metro State Prison, until it was closed in 2011.

== Fallen officers ==
Since the establishment of the Georgia Department of Corrections, 25 officers have died in the line of duty.

== Corrections results ==
According to a Pew Center on the States study in 2009, Georgia had one in 13 adults in the justice system. Figures for Georgia juveniles were not tabulated.

== Prison strike ==
In 2010, seven Georgia state prisons had inmates that participated in an organized strike. The 2010 Georgia prison strike demanded better healthcare, more sanitary conditions in prison and more educational opportunities.

== See also ==
- 2010 Georgia prison strike
- List of law enforcement agencies in Georgia
- List of United States state correction agencies
- Lists of United States state prisons
