= Forensic Files season 1 =

Forensic Files
- Season 1

Release
- Original network: TLC
- Original release: April 23 – December 19, 1996

Season chronology
- Next → Season 2

Forensic Files is an American documentary-style series which reveals how forensic science is used to solve violent crimes, mysterious accidents, and even outbreaks of illness. The show was broadcast originally on truTV, in reruns on HLN, was narrated by Peter Thomas, and produced by Medstar Television, in association with truTV Original Productions. It has broadcast 406 episodes since its debut on TLC in 1996 as Medical Detectives.

== Episodes ==
No. overall	No. in season	Title	Original release date
1	1	"The Disappearance of Helle Crafts"	April 23, 1996
In November 1986, 39-year-old Helle Crafts, a Danish flight attendant residing in Newtown, Connecticut, is reported missing, and police suspect her pilot husband, Richard, of foul play. A snowplow driver thinks that he saw Richard using a wood chipper near a river at 4:20 a.m. in the middle of a snowstorm, shortly before he reported his wife as missing. In a small eddy downstream, police find fragments of what would be identified as human bone, a fingernail, a tooth, and a few strands of hair. Investigators deduced Richard bludgeoned Helle to death in their bedroom, hid her in the freezer until their kids were out of the house, and then cut up her frozen body with the wood chipper, hoping her remains would end up in the river and be washed away, which most of them did, but the very few that did not were still enough to uncover the truth. Richard Crafts was subsequently arrested for killing his wife and sentenced to 50 years. This was Connecticut's first murder conviction without a body.
2	2	"The Magic Bullet"	October 17, 1996
At the Dallas, Texas 'Pistol & Revolver' club on September 29, 1991, 14-year-old Leland Harold "Trey" Cooley, a young spectator, was watching a shooting competition his father was judging while seated behind an air gun range. Out of nowhere, he was struck and killed by a stray bullet. Forensic scientists were able to pinpoint the origin and path of bullet, which exposed the faulty design of the outdoor shooting range. The Cooleys subsequently sued the gun club, winning millions in compensation, and the outdoor range was promptly shut down.
3	3	"The House that Roared"	October 10, 1996
On July 1, 1992, two weeks shy of her 43rd birthday, Caren Campano disappears from her Oklahoma City home, and the explanation of her third husband Chris does not hold up. Police find a large stain on the Campano's bedroom carpet. They perform an eerie chemical test that reveals a room spattered with blood which, when cleaned off, could not be seen by the naked eye. Complex 'reverse paternity' tests of Caren's relatives match her blood type to the blood on the carpet. The evidence indicated Chris Campano beat his wife to death, and he was sentenced to 1,000 years in prison, even though Caren's body was not found until a year later. Chris Campano was interviewed for this episode, clearly showing remorse, and understanding he has to pay for his crime.
4	4	"The Footpath Murders"	October 23, 1996
English detectives team up with a pioneering scientist to solve a case of sexual assault and serial murder. In 1983, a quiet country village in Leicestershire County, England is gripped with fear as authorities search for the killer of 15-year-old Lynda Mann. Clueless, they start again when Dawn Ashworth is killed three years later. They enlist the help of Dr. Alec Jeffreys, a molecular biologist who uses his breakthrough technique of genetic fingerprinting to rule out one suspect by comparing his DNA with that of semen found on the victims' bodies. Police set up a DNA dragnet to trap and convict the real killer, but are stymied when Richard Buckland confesses to the crime and his DNA does not match. Later, it is discovered that the true killer, Colin Pitchfork, had avoided giving a DNA sample during the dragnet and this brings the focus on him. This 1986 murder case is the first to use DNA as evidence in a criminal case.
5	5	"Planted Evidence"	October 24, 1996
In 1992, 32-year-old single mother Denise Johnson was found strangled to death in a deserted area outside of Phoenix, Arizona. Local investigators asked a molecular geneticist to pick out a tree in a 'lineup' when unidentified seed pods were found in suspect Mark Bogan's truck. The judge rules into evidence DNA profiles linking the pods to a tree near where the body was found. This proved the truck had been near the crime scene. Bogan claimed Denise tried to rob him, but investigators were sure he and Denise were having sex in the truck, and when he got too forceful and she objected, he killed her. This is the first US case where plant DNA was used to convict a criminal.
6	6	"Southside Strangler"	October 31, 1996
FBI psychological profiling and DNA evidence identify Timothy Wilson Spencer, who raped and strangled five young women in Virginia from 1984 through 1988. The U.S. criminal justice system's first use of DNA profiling in a serial murder case frees an innocent man after he spent five years in prison and convicts the real killer.
7	7	"Legionnaires' Disease"	November 7, 1996
In 1976 when 180 Legionnaires contract pneumonia-like symptoms after a convention in Philadelphia, Pennsylvania and 29 of them die, doctors and scientists are mystified. The determination of one scientist helps to determine the cause and likely vector of this deadly disease now known as Legionnaires' disease. This is one of the most famous medical detective stories.
8	8	"The Wilson Murder"	November 14, 1996
On May 22, 1992, 55-year-old Huntsville, Alabama eye doctor Jack Wilson was found dead by his second wife of 14 years, Betty, having been beaten, stabbed and lying in a pool of blood with a baseball bat nearby. Police arrest the elementary school's itinerant painter/handyman, James Dennison White, who is found with the doctor's credit cards. White subsequently reveals Betty Wilson was having an affair, and claims she and her twin sister, first-grade teacher Peggy Lowe, hired him to commit the murder. White and Betty Wilson are both sent to prison, but at Peggy Lowe's trial, defense attorneys bring in a forensic expert who testifies that the crime could not have been committed the way that White said it did, claiming he committed the murder of his own accord. This leads to Peggy being acquitted, but does not disprove suspicions of Betty's involvement, so she remains in prison, and the mystery goes unsolved.
9	9	"Deadly Neighborhoods"	November 21, 1996
Troubling clusters of deadly cancer cases strike concerned communities across the country. In 1987, residents of Maryvale, a Phoenix suburb, realize that too many children are fatally stricken with leukemia. And, on Meadow Street in Guilford, Connecticut, there is a disproportionate amount of illness, including four cases of brain cancer which garners national attention in 1990. Modern environmental agents such as buried poisons and electrical substations are found... Could these be the culprits?
10	10	"Insect Clues"	November 28, 1996
In July 1988, 42-year-old drifter Sandra Cwik was murdered in Buckman Springs, California, outside of San Diego. Abandoned in a remote area, her body was not discovered for several days and was covered with maggots. By analyzing the species of fly discovered at the recovery site, forensic entomologist David Faulkner was able to provide the compelling time-of-death evidence that convicted serial rapist/killer Ronald Porter.
11	11	"Outbreak"	December 5, 1996
In 1985, alarmingly high levels of thyroid hormones pump through the systems of over 100 residents of South Dakota and Minnesota. A similar case had occurred in Nebraska in April 1984. Investigators study one family who all got sick, except their 12-year-old son who is a vegetarian. It seems that when drug companies started manufacturing synthetic thyroid hormones, they stopped buying thyroid tissue from butchers who did not trim these parts, but rather sold them as 'extra lean beef'. The outcome: the USDA bans meat plants from using meat in or near the gullet for beef and pork products.
12	12	"The List Murders"	December 12, 1996
On November 9, 1971, John List left a note with the bodies of his mother Alma, his wife Patricia, and three children in his Westfield, New Jersey mansion ballroom, turned on funeral organ music, and disappeared. Eighteen years later, all detectives had to work from was an outdated photograph of List. In 1989, the television series America's Most Wanted commissioned an age-scaled bust of List to aid viewers in identifying the confessed murderer. Frank Bender, a nationally-recognized artist and sculptor, worked with forensic psychologist Richard Walter to develop a profile of the aging List. The final bust was so keenly accurate that 350 viewers called with tips, one of which led to List's arrest in Richmond, Virginia.
13	13	"Raw Terror"	December 19, 1996
Damion Heersink, an eleven-year-old boy from Dothan, Alabama, almost died in 1992 after eating an improperly cooked hamburger teeming with E. coli. Escherichia coli bacteria (E. coli) can be found in meats, in milk, and in water. When food is properly processed, prepared, and stored, E. coli are harmless. But in the absence of these simple precautions, E. coli can have deadly consequences.
