= Forensic Files season 2 =

Season of television series

Forensic Files
- Season 2

Release
- Original network: TLC
- Original release: October 2 – December 25, 1997

Season chronology
- ← Previous; Season 1 Next → Season 3

Forensic Files is an American documentary-style series which reveals how forensic science is used to solve violent crimes, mysterious accidents, and even outbreaks of illness. The show was broadcast on truTV, narrated by Peter Thomas, and produced by Medstar Television, in association with truTV Original Productions. It has broadcast 406 episodes since its debut on TLC in 1996 as Medical Detectives.

== Episodes ==
No. overall	No. in season	Title	Original release date
14	1	"The Common Thread"	October 2, 1997
Ten bodies had been found between the months of May and November 1984 in the Tampa, Florida area. The police discovered several similarities among these cases. Red carpet fibers had been found on all the bodies, some of the victims were found near tire tracks, and some had hairs from the perpetrator. It was not until November 3, 1984, that the case began to unfold as the perpetrator abducted a 17-year-old female named Lisa McVey but then released her. McVey went to the police with information, such as interior descriptions of the suspect's car and specifics about an ATM transaction, that eventually led to the arrest of Bobby Joe Long.
15	2	"The Dirty Deed"	October 9, 1997
On November 18, 1993, friends of Eileen and Derrick Severs called and notified the police that the wealthy sextagenarian couple had been missing for several days. The police searched the Severs' home in Hambleton, England and questioned their 37-year-old son Roger, who had recently moved in with his parents. Although the bodies had not yet been found, police arrested and detained Roger on suspicion of murdering his parents. Only after finding blood samples in Eileen's car and after careful analysis of the mud flaps on Derrick's car, were the police able to determine where Roger had buried his parents. Roger had waited for his father to return from a pub, having already killed his mother in the bathroom, and after killing Derrick as well, he used his mother's car to discard incriminating evidence and his father's car to transport the bodies to the burial site.
16	3	"Killer Fog"	October 16, 1997
One particular stretch on Interstate 75 in Tennessee seemed to be accident-prone resulting in seven multi-car accidents in 15 years including a 62-vehicle accident on November 5, 1978 and a 99-vehicle, multiple-fatality accident on December 11, 1990. Each accident was caused by a sudden and impenetrable fog, which forced drivers to suddenly brake without concern for those behind them. 30-year-old trucker Craig Tower was caught up in the accident while en route to visit his mother, Mike Bennett's truck was rear ended by a motor home just moments after he got out of it, an elderly woman and her granddaughter were sandwiched between two semis, and Daryl McKeehan and his family were bounced between the cars as if they were inside a giant pinball. Environmental experts and investigators analyzed the elements of nature occurring during this unnaturally-thick fog and tried to determine possible water sources that could create so many vapors in the air. They found one particular facility, the Bowater paper mill, near Calhoun and close to the interstate, that releases significant water vapors, which react to the weather and create this deadly fog. Bowater reached a $10 million settlement with victims and agreed to limit the use of pond 4. However, the accident killed 12 people, including Tower, the elderly woman, the father of the family in the motor home, and Daryl's wife, Judith.
17	4	"Sex, Lies and DNA"	October 23, 1997
In June 1989, Cindy Morris reported to the police in Phoenix, Arizona that her mother Ruby was missing. Ruby's husband, Gaylynn Earl Morris, became a suspect once blood samples were found in the bathroom leading police to believe that Ruby had suffered a severe blow to the head. Further investigation led to Earl's boat that had been taken out and never returned. There had been a report of a boat that caught fire and sank. Police were able to determine that the boat belonged to Earl after reviewing footage from a TV crew and photographs from the Coast Guard. Earl claimed that his wife had committed suicide and he disposed of her body for fear no one would believe it, but investigators were able to prove Earl had murdered Ruby and he was quickly convicted by the jury, who easily saw through his lies.
18	5	"Bitter Potion"	October 30, 1997
In 1988 in Alturas, Florida, 41-year-old waitress Peggy Carr, mother of three, stepmother of two, and grandmother of one, developed mysterious flu symptoms that no doctor was able to diagnose, until a neurologist noticed that her ailments were similar to that of a person poisoned by thallium. Subsequently, Peggy's son Duane Hibbert and stepson Travis Carr were hospitalized with similar symptoms. Peggy's second husband of only 6 months, Pye Carr, instantly became a suspect when the poison eventually killed his wife. However, investigators had to check if any other members of the Carr family had been exposed. Shockingly, all but one of them tested positive, the ones with the highest levels being Pye, Peggy's daughter Cissy, and Cissy's daughter Casey. The FBI quickly realized that Pye was not the killer, because he would not have taken such a large dose if he poisoned himself deliberately to throw off suspicion. The next logical suspect was the only family member who was not poisoned; Tammy Carr, Pye's daughter and Travis's sister. However, Tammy claimed that the family found a six-pack of Cokes at the back door the day before Peggy got sick, and had them with dinner that night. However, Tammy only drank diet soda, and had that instead. She also said that a week before then, Pye received a letter threatening to kill the family if they did not leave the state. The three remaining bottles tested positive for thallium, and found to have been doctored to hide the fact they had already been opened. This told the investigators the killer was someone outside the Carr household, and they turned their attention to the next door neighbors, George James Trepal and his wife Diana Carr (no relation), who both had extensive chemistry backgrounds and even used thallium poisoning as a plot device in a Mensa Murder Mystery Weekend that they hosted. When investigators searched the house, they found the poison and several books about how to use it. Trepal had overheard his wife fighting with Peggy over the family's noisy habits, which stressed out Diana and upset her work performance. Angry over seeing his wife suffer because no one cared about their opinions, Trepal tried to scare his neighbors away with the threatening letter, but when that did not work, he poisoned them. Trepal was convicted and sentenced to death for both Peggy's murder and the attempted murder of the rest of the Carr family, who all made full recoveries.
19	6	"The Blood Trail"	November 6, 1997
In Chipping Sodbury, England, 44-year-old Graham Backhouse was a farmer who was not well received by his community. On two occasions, Graham reported death threats. In 1984, when his wife Margaret went to use Graham's car to run errands, a bomb ignited when she started it, which nearly killed her. Soon after, police responded to a call from the farm, where they found that Graham had shot and killed his next door neighbor, Colin Bedale-Taylor, in the entry hall, claiming self-defense. The cuts and gashes on Graham's face and chest seemed to support this theory, as they matched a penknife in Taylor's hand which had some of Graham's blood on it and Taylor's initials etched into the handle. Taylor's son had died about a year earlier and he somehow blamed Graham for it, and it was apparent Taylor was behind all the attempts on Graham's life as an act of revenge. However, using forensic science, investigators found that Graham had actually manipulated the crime scene, fabricated the death threats, and planted the bomb, all an elaborate plot to kill his wife and benefit from her life insurance. However, when Margaret survived, he knew he would need a scapegoat to keep up the facade, so he used Taylor. Investigators easily discovered that the penknife actually belonged to Graham, and his wounds were self-inflicted. This proved to detectives that Taylor's murder was premeditated. Graham Backhouse was charged with the murder of Colin Bedale-Taylor and the attempted murder of his wife.
20	7	"Fatal Fungus"	November 13, 1997
In 1994, doctors in Cleveland, Ohio became extremely concerned when they had an increase in the number of infants brought to the emergency room with bleeding of the lungs. Doctors quickly contacted the Centers for Disease Control and had them investigate the matter. The CDC found that all babies were from the same neighborhood and that all of their houses had suffered from water damage. After further investigation and research, a black fungus was determined to be cause of the epidemic, the killer of six infants. The fungus develops in moist conditions, becomes airborne, and threatens developing organs such as the growing lungs of babies.
21	8	"Charred Remains"	November 20, 1997
In 1991, police in Vancouver, British Columbia were investigating a charred body found in a dumpster with a bullet hole in the skull when a missing person report was filed for Mary-Lynn Breeden. Police investigated her disappearance and found that a woman had attempted to withdraw money from Mary-Lynne's account. The woman was identified from video surveillance at the bank and was questioned by police. This then led police to Christian Cruz. Police found traces of blood in Cruz' car and were able to match it to the charred body through DNA testing of the body's tooth pulp and Breeden's family members.
22	9	"Something's Fishy"	November 27, 1997
In 1986, Excedrin bottles sold by a store in Kent, Washington were investigated by police after 40-year-old bank VP Susan Snow died from taking pills poisoned with cyanide. Her second husband, Paul Backwood, was briefly suspected but soon proven innocent. Investigators later found a chemical used to clean the algae in fish tanks mixed with the cyanide and, through pet store records, connected Susan's murder to the recent death of 52-year-old Bruce Nickell. Police managed to trace the chemical to Bruce's widow, Stella Nickell, and, with this new information, detectives re-opened the investigation into Bruce's death. Stella had increased Bruce's life insurance shortly before his death. Investigators then confronted the Nickells' daughter, who confessed she had helped her mother murder her father. Because the death had to be accidental in order to receive the insurance pay out, Stella laced several other bottles, waiting for a second poisoning to occur. Thanks to her daughter's testimony, Stella Nickell was convicted of the murders of both her husband and Susan Snow.
23	10	"Sealed with a Kiss"	December 4, 1997
In 1993, police in Coolbaugh, Pennsylvania were baffled when teacher Joanne Chambers received multiple death threats and questionable packages. Chambers reported every incident to the police, who in turn found a resemblance in the letters to statements that a fellow teacher, Paula Nawrocki, had made. However, the police were unable to find evidence directly linking Nawrocki to the threats. Regardless, Nawrocki was arrested and charged with harassment. Nawrocki's defense team sent the threatening letters and envelopes to be tested for DNA. The lab was able to determine that the saliva found on the stamp and envelope did not match Paula, but rather it matched Joanne Chambers. It was discovered that Chambers had previously made similar allegations at a different school.
24	11	"Postal Mortem"	December 11, 1997
Over the course of the day on October 15, 1985, police in Salt Lake City were called to two bombings. 31-year-old businessman and Mormon bishop Steve Christensen was killed by a bomb left in front of his office door. Christensen had resigned his job at a financial company following several fraud allegations, and the bombing was thought to be connected to this. The owner of a jewelry business located below Christensen's office described the man who delivered the package, but the description was mainly about his clothes and his facial description was vague. A similar bomb turned up at the home of Gary Sheets, who was Christensen's former business partner, killing his wife, 50-year-old Kathy, after she intercepted it. A teenage boy next door had witnessed the package being dropped off about midnight, but could only describe the car the suspect was driving, a tan minivan. Police had difficulty determining the motive for the killings until a third bomb went off, injuring 30-year-old Mark Hofmann, severing two of his fingers and lodging a piece of shrapnel in his kneecap. After careful analysis, however, it was determined that Hofmann was actually the bomber and that the bomb had gone off accidentally while he was moving it into his car. The motive for the killings was that Christensen discovered Hofmann had been forging and selling historical documents. Hofmann's main intention was to kill Christensen to avoid being exposed, and the other bombings were to make it seem as if all three were provoked by the financial scandal, to which Hofmann had no connection. Hofmann was charged with fraud, the murders of Steve Christensen and Kathy Sheets, and the attempted murder of Kathy's husband, Gary Sheets.
25	12	"Micro-Clues"	December 18, 1997
On August 4, 1993, 13-year-old Dario Cicolecchia never returned home from fishing at a Swiss creek. When his mutilated body was discovered two days later in a cornfield, sexual assault was first considered. When swab samples from the boy's body were analyzed, investigators found microscopic one-cell organisms called diatoms. A diatom is only found in water, so police began collecting samples from bodies of water in the area. Analysis of diatoms from a nearby creek matched those found on the boy's body and supplied police with the location of the murder. Months later, 35-year-old divorcee Roland Kubler was convicted of sexual assault and the attempted murder of another teenage boy, which brought him to the attention of investigators. Analysis of Kubler's car led to a match of diatoms found on Dario's body, which led to Kubler's arrest and conviction. Kubler was apparently homosexual and was especially attracted to teenagers. A shrine was built at the creek in Dario's memory, and a statue of him was erected on his grave, which symbolized the delicacy and vulnerability of people as youths.
26	13	"Deadly Parasites"	December 25, 1997
In April 1993, the Commissioner of Health was astonished when businesses throughout Milwaukee, Wisconsin were closing down due to large numbers of people reporting symptoms of gastrointestinal illnesses. Eventually, more than 400,000 of the city's 1.6 million people became ill and several people died. A waterborne parasite, cryptosporidium, was identified as the culprit after analysis of stools and water supplies. It was discovered that the city's sewage treatment outlet was too close to one of the city's water sources. The mayor quickly issued a boil water advisory that seemed to stop the outbreaks. This was the largest waterborne disease outbreak ever documented in the United States.
