= Forensic Files season 4 =

Forensic Files
- Season 4

Release
- Original network: TLC
- Original release: October 1 – December 29, 1999

Season chronology
- ← Previous; Season 3 Next → Season 5

Forensic Files is an American documentary series which reveals how forensic science is used to solve violent crimes, mysterious accidents, and even outbreaks of illness. The show is broadcast on truTV, narrated by Peter Thomas, and produced by Medstar Television, in association with truTV Original Productions. It has broadcast 406 episodes since its debut on TLC in 1996 as Medical Detectives. The HLN channel broadcasts new episodes once a week.

== Episodes ==
No. overall	No. in season	Title	Original release date
40	1	"Invisible Intruder"	October 6, 1999
On June 6, 1996, police in Rowlett, Texas received a call from Darlie Routier telling them of the murder of two of her three sons. However, police were unsure about the validity of her story and began an intensive search of the crime scene. The police determined the identity of the killer by analyzing blood spatter, doing behavioral profiling, and analyzing Routier's 911 call. The evidence proved that she killed her two older sons with a kitchen knife, inflicted wounds on herself, cleaned the evidence, and created the story of a crazed intruder. Routier was convicted of the first-degree murder of her 5-year-old son and was sentenced to death.
41	2	"The Killing Room"	October 13, 1999
In 1991, Scott Dunn disappeared. When investigators went through his Lubbock, Texas, apartment, they noticed a partial replacement of his bedroom carpeting with a large bloodstain underneath. Scott's father, Jim, worked closely with investigators and reported his suspicions of Scott's live-in girlfriend, Leisha Hamilton. Together, they fully investigated Leisha's story and uncovered another boyfriend named Timothy Smith. Leisha told Tim that Scott was losing interest in her. Police went to Tim's house and found the exact kind of tape used in the carpet cover-up of Scott's murder. They also found blood traces in Scott's bedroom that indicated he had suffered several blows to the head. This was enough to arrest both Tim and Leisha. Investigators believed Leisha had beaten Scott to death with a blunt object, then called Tim to help her dispose of the body. They also cleaned all visible traces of blood, except for the original section of carpeting, where Scott's head had likely been as he bled to death, so they had to replace it. Although Scott's body was never found during the investigation, Leisha was convicted of his murder and sentenced to 20 years in prison. Police deduced Tim Smith was not involved in committing the murder and he only helped with covering it up. As a result, Tim received only a few years probation in exchange for testifying against Leisha. Dunn's body was finally found in 2012.
42	3	"Ultimate Betrayal"	October 20, 1999
On October 24, 1995, Debora Green lost two of her three children in a fire that destroyed her Prairie Village, Kansas mansion. Debora, her estranged then-husband and the kids' father Michael Farrar, and the surviving child, their older daughter, were questioned. Suspicions arose when Debora refused to cooperate during questioning. Police then questioned Michael and uncovered disturbing stories proving that Debora was dangerous. She had poisoned Michael during their separation and told him that he would only get custody of the children over the kids' dead bodies. Debora's singed hair and the initial location of the fire proved that she was the arsonist.
43	4	"Cement the Case"	October 27, 1999
In 1990, Shirley Andronowich's body was found one morning after being raped, murdered with a concrete block, and mutilated in Winnipeg, Manitoba. Witnesses told police that Shirley and her husband Ed argued in a bar the night before. Police first suspected Ed and arrested him after he confessed to the murder. However, the forensic evidence proved that Ed was innocent, and he was released. A year later, police received a call about a man named Mark Jarman, who talked about being connected to Shirley's murder. Police discovered that his fingerprint matched the latent print left on the concrete block. Jarman was convicted of the murder.
44	5	"Innocence Lost"	November 3, 1999
On December 3, 1989, five-year-old Melissa Brannen went missing from a Christmas party in Lorton, Virginia. The fibers on her clothes were the only means for police to determine her abductor. Police grew suspicious of Cal Hughes who was washing his clothes at 1 a.m. when they went to his home. They searched his car and found several fibers similar to the clothes that Melissa had worn to the party. However, there was no way to test the fibers until an investigator's wife remembered seeing Melissa's outfit in a catalog. An identical outfit was located and tested. The fibers matched, and Cal Hughes was convicted of abduction with intent to defile and given a 50-year sentence.
45	6	"'Til Death Do Us Part"	November 10, 1999
In 1991, Robert Curley was diagnosed with Guillain–Barré syndrome when he arrived at the hospital with excruciating leg pains. However, doctors became suspicious during Robert's second admission and tested him for thallium poisoning, which proved positive, and Robert died shortly thereafter. Investigators also discovered that Robert's wife Joann was waiting to collect her previous husband's life insurance (from his accidental death) and disagreed with the way Robert wanted to spend it. Joann would then collect additional life insurance if Robert suffered from an accidental death. Joann was arrested five years later, confessed, and pleaded guilty to Robert's murder.
46	7	"Ties That Bind"	November 17, 1999
In 1983, two young boys were found tied and murdered with similar wounds within three months of each other in two Nebraska towns. The rope used to tie the boys was unique. Another clue turned up when a brother of one of the boys was hypnotized and remembered a uniformed man in a tan car. Shortly after, someone noticed a strange car and gave the license plate number to police. This vital information led to the capture and conviction of John Joubert, an enlistee in the Air Force who carried the same exact rope used to bind the two boys. He was convicted of both murders and later confessed to the murder of an 11-year-old boy in Portland, Maine.
47	8	"Body of Evidence"	November 24, 1999
On June 21, 1978, Mark Fair left for work and his fiancée Karla Brown remained at home in Wood River, Illinois. When Mark and a friend returned home that evening, they found Karla dead. The condition of Karla's body told investigators that she was a victim of sexual assault; she had resisted and was killed. The police questioned neighbors Paul Main and John Prante, but they were considered low-level suspects. During the autopsy, they were able to re-examine bite marks found on her body. A computer enhancement gave a better view of the bite marks and the science of forensic odontology identified John Prante as the perpetrator. On July 15, 1983, five years after the murder, Prante was found guilty of killing Karla and sentenced to 75 years in prison.
48	9	"Accident or Murder?"	December 1, 1999
On February 20, 1989, schoolteacher Clayton Johnson left for work. Later that morning, Mr. Molloy arrived to drop off his child at the Johnson home. He found Clayton's wife, Janice Johnson, lying at the bottom of the basement stairs in a pool of blood, and it was determined to be an accident. Later on, Clayton Johnson married a 22-year-old member of his church. When homicide investigator Brian Oldford heard this, he became suspicious and decided to reinvestigate. He learned that Clayton had obtained a $125,000 life insurance policy on Janice shortly before she died. Clayton Johnson was arrested and convicted of the first-degree murder of his wife. By examining the photos and nature of the injuries, the defense team was convinced that she had fallen backwards. The accidental fall scenario also accounted for the lack of defensive wounds on both Mrs. Johnson and Mr. Johnson, proving Janice's death really was an accident. After serving 5 years in prison, Clayton Johnson won his appeal and was released from prison.
49	10	"Core Evidence"	December 8, 1999
In 1996, 16-month-old Anna Grace Gimmestad became very ill, was rushed to the hospital and died within two weeks. Following extensive medical examinations, it was determined that Anna had been the victim of the deadly bacteria E. coli. Anna's mother recalled a trip to the grocery store, where Anna pointed excitedly at her favorite drink, Odwalla apple juice. As early as 1993, tests on samples of Odwalla juices found high levels of general bacteria because the company did not pasteurize its products. Federal and state inspection reports confirm that the company used two loads of apples with relatively high defect levels on the day that the juice was made. The genetic markings on the E. coli in the victims matched the bacteria found in the product bottled on that day. Odwalla pleaded guilty to violating federal food safety laws and agreed to pay a $1.5 million fine for the outbreak of E. coli in its juices.
50	11	"Haunting Vision"	December 15, 1999
On January 9, 1967, Lori Keidel, along with her two sisters and her brother were left at their Phoenix, Arizona home while their father went to a nearby laundromat. Suddenly, a large fire engulfed their home, killing Lori's sisters. Only a few months earlier on September 17, 1966, the children's mother, Dianne Grant Kidder Keidel, had disappeared. In 1993, Lori found the courage to tell police what she saw in 1966: Lori had witnessed her mother's death. In 1994, a concrete slab was removed from the yard, and a skeleton was found in the exact spot where Lori said it would be found. Gene Keidel was arrested for his wife's murder nearly 30 years after her death. Gene was convicted of first degree murder and sentenced to life in prison.
51	12	"With Every Breath"	December 22, 1999
Merril Bahe and Florena Woody grew up in starkly different conditions on an Indian reservation in Gallup, New Mexico. The couple soon engaged, and they moved into the Woody family home. In 1993, Florena started complaining of muscle aches in her back and shoulders, and her doctor gave her antibiotics for her condition. However, Florena later died from fluid in her lungs caused by her illness. Doctors did not know how what had killed her. Meanwhile, Merril Bahe started experiencing similar symptoms and on the day of Florena's funeral, he was sent to the hospital but died on the way. Investigators found deer mice which tested positive for a new form of the hantavirus. They determined that contact with the feces of the deer mice was what had caused the disease and that when the feces dried, the deadly microbe became airborne.
52	13	"Slippery Motives"	December 29, 1999
On June 3, 1986, Edward Post left the Omni Hotel in St. Louis, Missouri and went for a 40-minute jog. Before leaving, he said that he drew a bath for his wife, Julie Thigpen-Post. Ed returned and called the front desk, stating that his wife had fallen in the bathtub and was not breathing, and she was dead when emergency response arrived. The initial autopsy ruled the death accidental; however, investigators discovered that Ed had a $700,000 life insurance policy on Julie. A second autopsy found 36 areas of bruising, not noted during the original autopsy. The death was ruled a homicide, and Ed Post was charged with the first-degree murder of his wife and convicted. After serving six and a half years, Ed admitted to drowning his wife.
