= Forensic Files season 3 =

Forensic Files
- Season 3

Release
- Original network: TLC
- Original release: October 1 – December 24, 1998

Season chronology
- ← Previous; Season 2 Next → Season 4

Forensic Files is an American documentary-style television series which reveals how forensic science is used to solve violent crimes, mysterious accidents, and even outbreaks of illness. The show was broadcast originally on truTV, in reruns on HLN, and was narrated by Peter Thomas. It has broadcast 406 episodes since its debut on TLC in 1996 as Medical Detectives.

== Episodes ==
No. overall	No. in season	Title	Original release date
27	1	"Without a Trace"	October 1, 1998
In 1978, 11-month-old Chad Shelton was admitted to an Omaha, Nebraska hospital because of chronic vomiting. The next day, Chad went into a coma and died. His uncle, Duane Johnson, was also admitted to the hospital with the same symptoms and died the next day. Chad's parents and Duane's 2-year-old daughter suffered similar symptoms, but all of them survived. Dr. Renea Kimbrough discovered that all of the sick individuals had visited the Johnson home on Sunday, September 10, for a family gathering, and all ate a meal together. Everything in the Johnson home was analyzed. Investigators came to the conclusion that DMN was added to the lemonade that the family drank. Steven Roy Harper, a former boyfriend of Sandra Johnson, worked for the Eppley Institute, a local chemical company. Harper admitted to spiking their lemonade with DMN in an attempt to kill Sandra as revenge for the heartbreak she caused him. However, Sandra did not drink the lemonade. Duane drank two glasses of lemonade because he was winded from painting the house, therefore ingesting a fatal dose of the poison. The amount of poison Chad ingested was not fatal, but Chad's immune system was still developing and too weak to handle it, so Chad died from a dose that an adult would have survived. In 1979, Steven Harper was convicted of the murders of Chad and Duane and sentenced to death, but committed suicide while on death row in 1990.
28	2	"Knot for Everyone"	October 8, 1998
In the mid-1980s, bodies of nude women were found on a remote hill in the Sacramento, California area. The police got a break when a known prostitute escaped an attacker and was able to identify him and his automobile. The suspect was 48-year-old Roger Kibbe. Human hair found on one of the victims was similar to Kibbe's hair, and he was charged with first-degree murder. He later confessed to an additional murder committed in 1977.
29	3	"The Talking Skull"	October 15, 1998
In 1987, a human skull and some bones were discovered at a Boy Scout Camp near Farmington, Missouri. Also found were a pair of blue jeans, which helped determine the approximate height and weight of the victim. A facial reconstruction also helped the investigators. The victim was identified as St. Charles resident Bun Chee Nyhuis, a Thai immigrant who had been missing since 1983, and her husband Richard H. Nyhuis was now the prime suspect. Nyhuis was an assistant scoutmaster, which explained why Bun Chee's remains were discovered at a scout camp, and eventually, he confessed. He and Bun Chee had been arguing about money and he killed her in a fit of rage. Richard Nyhuis was convicted of murdering his wife and sentenced to life in prison.
30	4	"Foreign Body"	October 22, 1998
Between 1986 and 1989, a disease swept through British cattle herds. The disease came to be known as the mad-cow disease. Scientist began to suspect that this was somehow related to a human illness. A California neurologist, Dr. Stanley B. Prusiner, said that both humans and animals were suffering from mutated proteins known as prions. When prions are transmitted from an infected host to a new host, they convert normal proteins into prions. Therefore, it is possible for a prion to be transmitted from a cow to a person through beef consumption.
31	5	"Deadly Delivery"	October 29, 1998
Just before Christmas 1989, Judge Bob Vance was killed when he opened a package that contained a pipe bomb at his Alabama home. Two days later an attorney in Georgia lost part of his arm when he opened a similar package and succumbed to his injuries soon after. The police found two unopened packages that contained similar pipe bombs. The FBI's Behavioral Analysis Unit provided a psychological profile of the bomber. The profile matched that of Walter Leroy Moody, Jr., who was convicted of a similar bombing in 1972, when he tried to send a bomb to a man who repossessed his car, but his first wife intercepted it and was maimed by the explosion. Moody was imprisoned and his wife divorced him. A store clerk identified Moody and his second wife as the individuals who purchased four pounds of gunpowder and 1,000 CCI primers. Moody wanted to get back at the legal system for denying him the bar exam due to his previous conviction. Moody was convicted and sentenced to death by the electric chair.
32	6	"Similar Circumstances"	November 5, 1998
On April 19, 1989, Robert Sims arrived at his Alton, Illinois home and found his wife Paula unconscious on the kitchen floor and their newborn daughter Heather missing. Oddly, the couple's 2-year-old son Randy was asleep in his bed. Paula reported that a masked individual broke into their home and kidnapped Heather, whose body was later found in a garbage can. When the police learned that the Sims had another daughter, Loralei, reported kidnapped and, later, found dead near their Brighton, Illinois property in 1986, they began to focus on Paula. They later determined Paula had suffocated Heather and hid the body in her parents' freezer, as they were out of town, but they came home early when they heard about what had happened and Paula had to temporarily move Heather's body back to her own house, hiding it in the basement freezer, before eventually throwing her in the garbage can. Paula Sims was arrested and convicted of the first-degree murder of her daughter. Her husband Robert was cleared of all charges.
33	7	"Grave Evidence"	November 12, 1998
On June 2, 1976, 30-year-old Martin Dillon and his friend Dr. Stephen Scher went skeet shooting in Susquehanna County, Pennsylvania. By the end of the shooting session, Dillon was dead from a shot to the chest. According to Scher, Dillon's death was an accident (he tripped while chasing a porcupine and his gun went off), and the police and coroner ruled as such. However, soon after the shooting, Dr. Scher divorced his wife Anne, married Martin's widow, Patricia Dillon, and moved to Lincolnton, North Carolina. This aroused the suspicions of Martin's parents, who fought to get the investigation reopened. Eventually, it was, and it was determined that Martin had been shot from a distance and was in a sitting position, contradicting Scher's story. Police soon uncovered that Patricia was a nurse at Dr. Scher's Susquehanna hospital. In 1996, Dr. Stephen Scher was questioned again and changed his story to self-defense, but investigators uncovered that he was having an affair with Patricia and claimed he had killed Martin to have her for himself. Scher denied this, claiming his new story was the truth, but police had him charged with murder and he was quickly convicted and sentenced to life in prison. In 1999, Scher's conviction was overturned by a judge due to possible prejudice, but Scher was convicted again for the same crime in 2008 and was again sentenced to life in prison. The episode was updated to include Scher's release and second conviction.
34	8	"Deadly Formula"	November 19, 1998
In 1989, David and Patricia Stallings of Hillsboro, Missouri had their first child, Ryan, whose health took a turn for the worse by the time he was five months old. Ryan had a series of blood tests, which showed unusually high levels of ethylene glycol, which is the main active ingredient in antifreeze. Patricia Stallings was arrested, and a few days later, Ryan died. While in prison, Patricia gave birth to another son, David, who suffered from the same symptoms as his brother Ryan had; however, he was not in Patricia's care at the time. After re-testing both children’s blood, results showed that there was no evidence of ethylene glycol. It was determined that both children had a rare genetic disorder called methylmalonic acidemia. Patricia Stallings was released on July 30, 1991, as no crime had been committed.
35	9	"Beaten by a Hair"	November 26, 1998
In 1992, Laura Houghteling disappeared from her Bethesda, Maryland home and was never seen again. After five days, police found a bloody pillow and pillowcase lying in the woods not far from Laura's house. Laura's bedroom was then searched using luminol, which reacts with the enzymes in blood. The police now had a prime suspect, her part-time gardener Hadden Clark. Amido black was used to enhance the fingerprints found on the bloody pillowcase, which were matched to Clark. In 1993, Clark pleaded guilty to Houghteling's murder.
36	10	"Crime Seen"	December 3, 1998
In 1984, a couple set off for a camping trip but got lost and fell asleep at a scenic overlook in rural Virginia. They awoke to a person with a gun tapping on their car window. He ordered the boyfriend to run into the woods and drove off with his girlfriend. The man repeatedly raped and sodomized the young woman, and then he let her go. When she got back to her car, she met her boyfriend, who was there with the police. The girlfriend positively identified Edward Honaker as the man who raped her. Honaker was given three life sentences. Years later, new DNA testing was available, and the girlfriend admitted that she had another man in her life at the time of the rape. The DNA in the semen was not that of Honaker, the boyfriend, or the second man. Honaker was then released from prison after serving 10 years.
37	11	"Speck of Evidence"	December 10, 1998
On September 17, 1984, 8-year-old Vicki Lynne Hoskinson left her home in Flowing Wells, Arizona to run an errand for her mother. She never returned home. Vicki's pink bicycle was found abandoned and slightly damaged later that afternoon on a nearby street, but there was no sign of her. Police investigators learned that Frank Jarvis Atwood, released after serving time for child molestation in California, had been in the Tucson area but was now gone. The FBI confiscated Atwood's car and found paint from Vicki's bicycle on his car. They also matched nickel found on the bike to nickel on Atwood's bumper. Atwood was sentenced to death.
38	12	"Broken Bond"	December 17, 1998
In 1983, Morgan, the 9-month-old daughter of Ray and Tanya Reid, suffered a sleep apnea episode at her home in Deaf Smith County, Texas and was admitted to the hospital for four days. Morgan continued to experience occasional apnea episodes and suffered a fatal attack on February 7, 1984. In 1985, Tanya Reid gave birth again, this time to a son named Michael. Michael was hospitalized over 20 times during the next two years. When Michael was temporarily taken away from his mother, he did not experience any seizures or apnea episodes. When prosecutors asked pathologists to re-open Morgan's autopsy records, they discovered that an x-ray taken during the autopsy revealed that she did not die of SIDS but suffered from brain damage consistent with being shaken violently. Doctors then determined that Tanya was exhibiting symptoms of Münchausen syndrome by proxy. Tanya was convicted for felony child endangerment of Michael and for the murder of Morgan. The murder conviction was later overturned; however, Tanya was convicted a second time.
39	13	"Out of the Ashes"	December 24, 1998
In 1993, 18-year-old Rose Larner went missing in Albion, Michigan. Her boyfriend, John Ortiz-Kehoe, and her childhood friend, Billy Brown, told police that they saw her early on December 7, but did not know where she went after that. Two years later, an investigation revealed that Billy Brown and John Kehoe were both local drug users/dealers. Brown feared that he might be implicated in Larner's disappearance, so he decided to cooperate with police. He told them that Larner was murdered by Kehoe two years earlier in Kehoe's grandparents' home. According to Billy Brown, Larner refused to participate in a sexual threesome, so Kehoe strangled her, placed her in the shower, dismembered her body, burned the pieces in the backyard, and scattered the ashes on a highway. Police compared a tiny speck of blood found at Kehoe's grandparents' home to a sample of blood taken from Larner six years earlier, and it matched. Kehoe was convicted of murder and sentenced to life in prison without parole. Billy Brown was convicted for being an accessory and served one year in prison.
