= Martin S. Zied =

Documentary filmmaker

Martin S. (Marty) Zied (born November 30, 1951) is a six-time Emmy Award winning documentary television and film producer, director, and writer. His Emmys include The Kerner Commission Report - 20 Years Later, The Homeless, and Love and Anger. Zied also co-produced the 20/20 episode that featured a one-on-one interview with Osama Bin Laden, 48 Hours Mystery Virginia Tech Anatomy of a Rampage, and MSNBC Investigates A Different Drum, where he led the first-ever camera crew into the Burning Man Festival.

== Career ==
Year	Network	Show	Role
1998	TLC	Medical Detectives; Forensic Files; Teacher TV	Producer
2000–2001	MSNBC	Headliners & Legends with Matt Lauer; MSNBC Investigates; Attack on America, A Doctor's Tale	Producer
2001–2002	ABC	Primetime; 20/20; 20/20 Downtown	Producer
2003	A&E	Biography	Producer
2002–2008	CBS	48 Hours Mystery	Producer; Director; Writer

== Current ==
Zied's current projects include a biography about Philadelphia baseball star, Dick Allen, and the feature-length film, Voice Messages. He is the Senior Producer for the Paul F.Harron studios at Drexel University in Philadelphia. His class in television production won a regional Emmy Award (2012) and has won 3 Telly Awards (2010, 2011, 2012).

== Awards ==
- 1984–85 Emmy for Outstanding Feature News/” The Homeless.”
- 1986 PWIC Sarah Award TV Feature
- 1987 PWIC Sarah Award TV Feature
- 1987–88 Emmy for Outstanding Feature News/” The Kerner Commission Report-20 yearslater.”
- 1988–89 Emmy for Outstanding TV Series/” Women Behind Bars.”
- 1989–90 Emmy for Outstanding Feature News/Series/” Love and Anger.”
- 1990–91 Emmy for Outstanding Service News/” How to Avoid Raising a Brat.” National Academy of Television Arts & Sciences
- (NATAS) award for Best College Production Newscast
- 2011 PennState Abington/Alumni Achievement Award
