= Skip Palenik =

American forensic scientist (born 1946)

Skip Palenik (/ˈpælənɪk/ PAL-ə-nik; born July 24, 1946) is an American analytical microscopist, forensic scientist, lecturer, and author. He is most famous for providing trace evidence analysis and forensic microscopy for many high-profile cases including the Oklahoma City Bombing, Unabomber investigation, Hillside Strangler investigation and the JonBenet Ramsey case, and for his contributions to books and television programs including Forensic Files, to which he was a frequent contributor.

== Life and career ==
Skip Palenik was born in Chicago, Illinois, U.S. on July 24, 1946. His interest in forensic science stemmed from his first chemistry set and microscope at the age of eight. His father, a truck driver, constructed an increasingly sophisticated basement laboratory for Skip and his younger brother Mark. The laboratory eventually tapped into the household gas line to supply a Meker burner, and a hole was placed in the foundation to provide a vent for a wooden fume hood. Chemistry experiments that included synthesizing a rocket fuel and precipitating nitroglycerine were supplied by trips to Chicago area pharmacies and laboratory supply houses to acquire chemicals. Forensic science, and in particular, the study of traces of materials under the microscope fascinated Skip.

Following time in Army military intelligence, Palenik went on to obtain a degree in chemistry from the University of Illinois at Chicago. He went on to work for his boyhood hero, Walter McCrone from 1974 to 1992.

In 1992, Palenik founded his own laboratory, Microtrace, which was dedicated to the identification and characterization of microscopic traces and the microanalytical characterization of materials. Over this period, Skip has testified in criminal and civil cases in local, state, federal and foreign courts and has authored numerous book chapters and articles. Palenik has also given numerous lectures and workshops in the area of trace evidence, including dust analysis, polarized light microscopy, forensic hair microscopy, forensic soil analysis, and forensic fiber analysis around the world.

== Cases and teaching ==
Palenik has worked on many of the most famous murder and mystery cases in recent American memory. His resume includes work on: the Atlanta child murders, the Air India Bombing, JonBenet Ramsey case, 1985 Narita International Airport bombing (Tokyo), Hillside Strangler (LA), Oklahoma City bombing, John Demjanjuk (Jerusalem), assassination of Martin Luther King Jr. (reinvestigation by U.S. House Select Committee on Assassinations), Unabomber, the disappearance of Helen Brach, the “Kiki” Camarena Murder Case and the Green River Serial Murders.

Palenik has also taught microscopy at Illinois Institute of Technology, the University of Illinois at Chicago, and the McCrone Research Institute, and has contributed to many books and publications. Palenik's limited liability company, Microtrace, provides microscopy, microchemistry, and forensic consulting services to a variety of clients including forensic laboratories and manufacturers.

== Awards and honors ==
- 2013 recipient of the “Edmond Locard Award for Excellence in Trace Evidence” presented by the American Society of Trace Evidence Examiners.
- 2012 recipient of the “Ernst Abbe Memorial Award” presented by the New York Microscopical Society.
- 2010 recipient of the “Chamot Medal” in chemical microscopy by the State Microscopical Society of Illinois.
- 2009 recipient of the “Paul L. Kirk Award” given by the Criminalistics section of the American Academy of Forensic Sciences.
- 2003 Distinguished Scientist Award from the Midwestern Association of Forensic Sciences
