= Brian Keith Lord =

American murderer and rapist (born 1961)

- Born: Brian Keith Lord; December 29, 1960 (age 65); Merced, California
- Convictions: California; Second degree murder Washington; Aggravated first degree murder
- Penalty: Death, commuted to life imprisonment

Details
- Victims: 2+
- Span of crimes: 1975–1986
- Country: United States
- States: California and Washington
- Date apprehended: 1975; 1986;

Brian Keith Lord (born December 29, 1960) is an American murderer whose case was featured on Forensic Files.

== Early life ==
Brian Lord was born to Floy Ione "Scott" Lord (August 9, 1930 – September 2, 1993) and Leslie Samuel Lord (May 6, 1919 – October 22, 2006) on December 29, 1960 in Merced, California. His father served in World War II before working for Flintkote. Lord was one of 10 children, consisting of seven girls and three boys.

In 1983, Lord moved to Silverdale, Washington.

== Crimes ==
On July 11, 1975, at the age of 14, Lord murdered his neighbor Sylvia Lynn Henderson in Catheys Valley, California. Henderson was a friend of Lord's family. She was shot in the back of the head with a .22 caliber handgun as she hung clothes on a clothesline. The gun Lord used belong to Henderson and her husband. Her body was found in the bedroom of her house next to the phone. She died a few minutes after paramedics arrived. Lord was apprehended by the Mariposa County Sheriff's Office about 6 hours after the shooting. Lord plead guilty to second degree murder and spent 6 months in a home for boys before being released

On October 31, 1980, a 19-year-old Lord was arrested after kidnapping a 14-year-old girl and attempting to rape her. Lord had lead the police on a 40-mile chase from Chowchilla to his home in Catheys Valley. After returning home, he barricaded himself in his house for 90 minutes before being arrested.

In 1986, at the age of 25, he was hired as a carpenter at the home of Wayne and Sharon Frye. Through this job he met 16-year-old Tracy Parker, a sophomore at North Kitsap High School. Lord subsequently became acquainted with Tracy, who often rode horses owned by the Fryes.

Finding himself alone with her on the night of September 16, 1986, Lord persuaded her to get into his truck under the guise of giving her a ride home. He drove to his brother's workshop, somehow coerced her into going inside, and raped and murdered her. Parker's mother reported her missing the next day.

=== Investigation ===
When examined, it was found that Tracy did not take her purse, wallet, or make up with her. Initially, Kitsap County Sheriff believed that Parker was not the victim of foul play, and may have been a runaway. Parker's parents were going through a divorce, and she had threatened to leave home previously due to how upset she was.

Investigation into Tracy's disappearance initially focused on the Fryes. Her last discernible interaction was a telephone call made by her to her friend from their residence. On September 21, 1980, her clothes were found by volunteer searchers at Island Lake. Her clothes were found in a neat pile off the roadway. Articles found included her jeans, sweatshirt, underwear, and shoes. Her jeans had stains suspected to be blood on them. Her semi-nude body was found on September 30 near Bangor, Washington. Her autopsy was performed at Harborview Medical Center in Seattle, where it was determined that she had been killed by being bludgeoned in the head with a hammer.

Investigators began considering Lord as a suspect after it was discovered that he called his family roughly ten minutes prior to Tracy from the same phone that Tracy called her friend on. Lord denied any involvement and informed police that he had traveled to his brother's workshop that night. The workshop was investigated as a possible murder location which led to the discovery of a large blood spot on the floor; samples of material from the workshop were collected. The hammer that Lord allegedly used to kill Parker was also found in the workshop. A green paint chip found on Tracy's body was matched to a dismantled fence that Lord had hauled in his truck, thus incriminating him. Lord's brother, who was in California at the time of the murder, said that he found him hosing down the garage after he arrived home. The next day, Lord's brother said that he had washed down the back of the truck he was seen driving the previous night.

=== Prosecution ===
Lord was arrested, tried, convicted, and sentenced to death in 1987. During the trial, he leveled threats at the Parker family. His death sentence was voided in 1997, his conviction was overturned in 1999, and after much delay, was given a new trial in 2003. Lord was again convicted and was given a life sentence.

He is currently incarcerated at the Washington State Penitentiary in Walla Walla, Washington.

== See also ==
- List of United States death row inmates
