= How the West was Lost (miniseries) =

- Genre: Documentary
- Written by: Linda Berger, Harvey Ardman
- Directed by: Chris Wheeler, Sonny Hutchison
- Narrated by: Peter Thomas
- Theme music composer: Peter Kater
- Country of origin: United States
- Original language: English
- No. of seasons: 2
- No. of episodes: 13

Production
- Executive producers: Jim Berger, Steve Thaxton, Cindy Velasquez
- Producers: Chris Wheeler, Sonny Hutchison

Original release
- Network: Discovery Channel
- Release: May 16, 1993 – February 14, 1995

How the West was Lost is a 1993 television documentary miniseries about the westward expansion across the North American continent during the latter half of the 19th Century from the point of view of the Native American peoples. The episodes used "more than 1,200 rare archival photographs, creating images that enhance the first-hand and personal tales of family and tribal history." It was directed by Chris Wheeler and Sonny Hutchison and narrated by Peter Thomas. It was produced by KUSA-TV for the Discovery Channel. The series won the Cable ACE award for "Educational Special or Series" in 1994.

== Episodes ==
=== Season 1 ===
1. A Clash of Cultures - In 1864 Kit Carson forces the Navajo on the Long Walk from Canyon de Chelly to the Bosque Redondo.
2. I Will Fight No More, Forever - The Nez Perce fight 13 battles with the Army to regain Pacific Northwest land taken by treaty.
3. Always the Enemy - Apaches Victorio and Geronimo escape the Gila River reservation.
4. The Only Good Indian, is a Dead Indian - Black Kettle leads the Cheyenne of Sand Creek Reserve against the forces of Col. John Chivington.
5. A Good Day to Die - Discovery of gold in the sacred Black Hills leads to the Battle of Little Bighorn.
6. Kill the Indian, Save the Man - The murder of Sitting Bull and defeat at Wounded Knee break the Indian spirit.

=== Season 2 ===
1. Divided We Fall - Hiawatha persuades the five Iroquois nations to unite; missionaries and the fur trade rekindle tribal rivalries.
2. The Trail of Tears - The Indian Removal Act of 1830 forces the Cherokee to move west of the Mississippi.
3. The Unconquered - Georgia planters, blaming Seminoles for hiding escaped slaves, enforce the Indian Removal Act.
4. Let them Eat Grass - After 10 years of broken promises and disdain, Little Crow leads the starving Dakotas to war.
5. Death Will Come Soon Enough - The Modoc people, forced to live on a reservation, return to their home in the Lost River country.
6. The Utes Must Go! - Miners seek to remove the Ute people from the newly recognized state of Colorado.
7. As Long As the Grass Shall Grow - American Indians, forcibly removed from their homes, settle in Oklahoma.
