= Norfolk Four =

Four United States Navy veterans wrongfully convicted of murder

The Norfolk Four are four former United States Navy sailors: Joseph J. Dick Jr., Derek Tice, Danial Williams, and Eric C. Wilson, who were wrongfully convicted of the 1997 rape and murder of 18-year-old Michelle Moore-Bosko while they were stationed at Naval Station Norfolk. They each declared that they had made false confessions, and their convictions were considered highly controversial. A fifth man, Omar Ballard, confessed and pleaded guilty to the crime in 2000, insisting that he had acted alone. He had been in prison since 1998 because of violent attacks on two other women in 1997. He was the only one of the suspects whose DNA matched that collected at the crime scene, and whose confession was consistent with other forensic evidence.

Nearly ten years later, after the four recanted their confessions and entered years of appeals, they gained support for a clemency campaign and received conditional pardons in 2009 from then-Virginia Governor Tim Kaine. New exculpatory evidence was found after that and the Norfolk Four were exonerated in 2017, receiving absolute pardons by Virginia Governor Terry McAuliffe. In December 2018, they received a combined settlement of $4.9 million from the City of Norfolk and $3.5 million from the Commonwealth of Virginia for their wrongful convictions.

These four were among a total of eight men whom the Norfolk Police indicted and initially prosecuted as suspects in what the prosecution said was a multiple offender crime. Three men, named by others from the four, were released and their charges dismissed, because of lack of evidence against them. Omar Ballard, a man who had an independent association with the Boskos, was the last arrested for this crime in March 1999 after it was found his DNA matched that at the crime scene, and was the only match made. He confessed in March and April 1999 and insisted that he committed the rape and murder of Moore-Bosko by himself, but the prosecution continued to press the theory of a group crime. In 2000, Ballard pleaded guilty and was sentenced to 100 years in prison, 59 of which were suspended by the court. Forensic evidence is consistent with his account that there were no other participants.

Each of the Norfolk Four had confessed to the police about these crimes, but later recanted their confessions, saying they had been threatened and coerced by Norfolk detectives, and their confessions were false. Williams and Dick pleaded guilty to rape and murder before trial, under threat of receiving the death penalty. Dick testified for the state in trials in 1999 and 2000 against the other two defendants. Each of their DNA was excluded from matching that collected in evidence from the scene. As there was virtually no physical evidence against them, Wilson and Tice were convicted by juries based on their confessions. With the plea deals and trial, Tice, Williams, and Dick, were convicted of both rape and capital murder, and sentenced to one or more life sentences without the possibility of parole. Wilson was acquitted of murder but convicted of rape; he was sentenced and served 8½ years in prison.

== Events and investigation ==
On July 8, 1997, Bill Bosko, a 19-year-old sailor in the US Navy, returned home after a week at sea, and found the body of his wife Michelle Moore-Bosko, 18, who had been murdered at their apartment at the Bayshore Apartment Gardens in Norfolk, Virginia. High school sweethearts, they had married in April 1997 in Norfolk. He went to his neighbor Danial Williams's apartment for help, and they called the Norfolk Police Department.

Moore-Bosko was found to have been raped, stabbed, and strangled to death. At the time, police noted that there were no signs of a break-in or a large struggle inside the apartment. The crime was estimated to have taken place during the night before, sometime after 11:30 pm on July 7, 1997. Neighbor Tamika Taylor said she had been out with Moore-Bosko most of that day from noon until that time.

The coroner's report said that Moore-Bosko had died due to being stabbed and strangled. As introduced in evidence in the trials, the state's medical examiner described the stab wounds to Moore-Bosko as of a uniform depth and clustered closely together. He said that the pattern was consistent with a scenario in which one assailant had stabbed her multiple times, but there was an outside possibility of more.

As the Norfolk police investigation progressed, detectives questioned residents of Moore-Bosko's development. Tamika Taylor told one of them that their neighbor, Danial Williams, was "obsessed" with the murdered woman. Williams, also a sailor in the US Navy, lived in an apartment across the hall from the Boskos, with his wife Nicole. They had recently married after she was diagnosed with ovarian cancer (she died on November 2, 1997). They shared their apartment with Joe Dick (Joseph P. Dick, Jr.), another sailor who was a shipmate from Williams's USS Saipan.

=== Confessions ===
Detective Ford arrested Williams and led the interrogations. According to Williams, he had been interrogated for eight hours before Ford began at 5 AM. He obtained a confession from Williams within another hour. Williams said he felt threatened and treated like a criminal until he was overwhelmed and worn down.

His later defense lawyers (as of 2007) said it appeared Ford and other investigators were satisfied with Williams's confession and after they indicted him in August 1997, not much happened in the investigation for several months. The attorneys found no record or evidence that the police ever searched Williams's apartment despite his status as a prime suspect, or tried to recover any evidence, such as blood from the crime scene, his own blood, or DNA from the victim on his clothing or items in his apartment. They never took an affidavit from his wife. The Norfolk Commonwealth's Attorney's office, which conducts prosecutions, later refused Freedom of Information Act (FOIA) requests for records related to the Norfolk Four case.

His attorneys asked the court for funds to investigate further crimes in the area, which would have revealed the additional rape by Ballard, but the funds were never spent. Several days after his wife's death in early November, he filed a motion to suppress his confession, but the court rejected it.

It was not until December 11, 1997, that police learned that Williams' DNA did not match the DNA evidence taken from the scene. They did not tell his attorney until April 30, 1998. In January 1998 they offered him a plea bargain in exchange for a life sentence, which he refused. Needing to expand their field, they arrested Williams' roommate and shipmate Joe Dick as a suspect.

Dick maintained his innocence for hours, saying that he was on duty on his ship USS Saipan at the time of the murder. According to a 2007 New York Times feature article, neither his supervising Chief Petty Officer, Senior Chief Michael Ziegler, nor his supervisor, Commander Scott Rettie, were interviewed by Norfolk police or Dick's defense counsel Michael Fasanaro, Jr. As far as the Navy men knew, no records were sought from the ship, although ship logs and attendance records show clearly who is on duty at every hour. Those records were destroyed before the New York Times published a feature on this case in August 2007.

Dick's original defense attorney, Fasanaro, and the lead prosecuting assistant commonwealth's attorney, Damian J. Hansen, continued to assert that Dick was not on the ship that night. But Ziegler told the New York Times in 2007 that he had "no doubt" that Dick was on duty that night. Already aware of and concerned about what he perceived as Dick's limited mental capacity, Ziegler stressed the high security maintained on the ship. He did not believe that Dick was capable of sneaking off and on the ship to commit the crime and return. But, since Dick pleaded guilty before trial, the state never had to prove their assertion or break his alibi.

Eleven weeks later, in March 1998, Dick's DNA was also excluded as a match to the forensic DNA evidence found on Moore-Bosko. Because Williams had refused the plea bargain offered by the prosecution, his attorneys ordered a competency evaluation in February 1998. He told the psychiatrist that he was not guilty and had made a false confession.

=== Investigation expands, new arrests are made and confessions are gained ===
The police and prosecution decided to widen their search again for suspects. A jailhouse informant, at the jail where Dick was being held pending trial, suggested that he name a co-conspirator. He named Eric Wilson, another sailor. Wilson's DNA was also excluded from matching the evidence at the scene.

The police came back to Dick for more suspects. He said that a fourth man, whom he called "George" but who he identified from Navy photographs as Derek Tice, was also involved. Three of these four men were on active duty with the Navy and one was recently retired. None of them had a prior criminal record. Ford went to Florida, where Tice was then living, to arrest him.

After being arrested and interrogated for eleven hours, Tice finally also confessed to the crime. In the process, he implicated two additional Navy men as having been involved in the crime. He claimed that the group of several men had broken into the apartment and each attacked Moore-Bosko. But this contradicted the police review of the crime scene and evidence. The apartment did not appear to have been broken into or disrupted, and there was no evidence of wide-scale violence from several people. The small apartment was neat and clean. Within weeks, Tice's DNA was also excluded from matching the DNA evidence collected at the scene.

These men: Richard D. Pauley, (USN), retired; and Geoffrey A. Farris, (USN) were arrested for rape and capital murder but did not confess. Farris asked for counsel and stopped his interrogation. Pauley was verified as being hundreds of miles away, where he lived and worked, at the time of the murder, as shown by his work records and by bank records of his having withdrawn money from a cash machine at that distant location. At a late August 1998 hearing about Pauley and Farris, Dick testified that these two were involved in the attack on Moore-Bosko, but said he had not seen Farris stab her. Their attorneys challenged the theory of multiple offenders, but the judge decided there was probable cause and indicted them.

After being interrogated again in October 1998, Tice named John E. Danser, (USN), as a seventh suspect. He did not confess; he had retired from the Navy and lived and worked in Warminster, Pennsylvania, 300 miles from Norfolk. Despite his having two paper records supporting that he was there at the time of the murder, he was indicted for rape and capital murder.

In November Tice recanted his accusation against Danser and his own confession when talking to detective Ford, but the Commonwealth attorney's office did not give this information to Danser's attorney. A month later, Tice repeated his accusation against Danser at the latter's preliminary hearing.

In February 1999, a refined DNA test excluded all seven men from the forensic DNA associated with the crime. None of the last three men indicted was tried, and the state charges against them were eventually dismissed. But detective Glenn Ford and prosecutor Damian J. Hansen continued to act at the trials of Wilson and Tice in 1999 and 2000 as if the other men were still part of a large, multiple offender attack.

=== Omar Ballard ===
In the summer of 1997, Omar Abdul Ballard, had met the Bosko couple. On June 27, 1997, he had beaten Melissa Morse with a bat at the Bayshore Apartment Gardens complex, where the Boskos also lived. That night, his friend Tamika Taylor took him to her neighbors, the Boskos for refuge. William Bosko briefly gave him shelter at their apartment, turning away men who were seeking him.

On July 17, 1997, about 10 days after the rape and murder of Moore-Bosko, Ballard beat and raped a fourteen-year-old girl about a mile from the Bayshore apartment complex. He was later apprehended and, on January 15, 1998, he pleaded guilty to this crime. A month later he pleaded guilty to the attack on Morse. He was sentenced to a total of 41 years in prison for these two crimes. In February 1999, he sent a letter from prison to a female acquaintance threatening her, and claiming to have murdered Michelle Moore-Bosko.

In 2005 Taylor claimed that she had told the Norfolk police soon after the Moore-Bosko murder that they should investigate Ballard as a possible suspect.

Ballard was not investigated until February 1999, after the police received a copy of the letter he wrote from prison claiming he had killed Moore-Bosko. He twice confessed to the police in March 1999, and again in April 1999, in papers filed with the court.

In March 1999 he was arrested as the eighth suspect in this case: his DNA was verified as matching that found at the Moore-Bosko crime scene; he was the only suspect whose DNA did match that at the scene. In addition, Ballard confessed to the crime. Unlike the other suspects, he provided details of the crime in his confession that were consistent with the physical and forensic evidence. He told investigators that "Them four people who opened their mouths is stupid". Despite police and prosecution pressure to implicate Williams, Dick, Tice, and Wilson, Ballard insisted until his plea bargain that he had committed the crime alone. He did not testify against the four other defendants who confessed.

But, the police and prosecutors incorporated Ballard into their theory of a group crime with multiple offenders, which had grown to included eight assailants. Seven of the men had associations through the Navy. They claimed in court that Ballard refused to name his accomplices for fear of being labeled a "snitch". They said that the first four suspects arrested, although they had been willing to implicate others in the crime, were afraid of Ballard, and specifically refused to implicate him. But they did not know him. In June 1999, Ballard was indicted for rape, capital murder and robbery.

=== Eight men arrested and indicted ===
Listed in order of arrest for capital murder and rape from July 1997 to June 1999; ages at time of crime:

- Danial Williams (USN) 25
- Joseph J. Dick Jr. (USN) 21
- Eric C. Wilson (USN) 21
- Derek Tice (USN) 27
- Richard D. Pauley Jr. (USN), was interrogated but did not confess to the crime. Records supported that he was talking and emailing with his girlfriend in Australia for 3 hours in the period when the murder was believed committed; although he was indicted, charges against him were dismissed.
- Geoffrey A. Farris (USN), was interrogated but asked for an attorney and did not confess.
- John E. Danser (USN), worked and lived nearly 300 miles away in Warminster, Pennsylvania, by the time of the murder. He did not confess. He had two records that established him in Pennsylvania; charges against him were finally dismissed before trial.
- Omar Ballard, pleaded guilty in 1998 to beating Melissa Morse and to raping a 14-year-old; he was sentenced to 41 years and was serving time for those crimes when arrested and interrogated in the Moore-Bosko rape/murder. He confessed to the crime in detail, saying he had acted alone. He had earlier taken credit for it in a February 1999 letter to a friend.

== Trials ==
Threatened by the prosecution with potential sentences of the death penalty, Williams and Dick each pleaded guilty to rape and capital murder and agreed to a stipulation of facts, Williams in January 1999. They were not tried before a jury. They were each sentenced to life in prison without possibility of parole. In addition, Dick agreed to testify as a state's witness against the other two defendants in their trials.

Wilson's trial began June 14, 1999. He was acquitted of murder and found guilty of rape. He recanted his confession and explained that he had given it to end Ford's aggressive interrogation. Damian J. Hansen was co-prosecutor, one of the three assistant commonwealth attorneys of the Norfolk Commonwealth's Attorney's office who prosecuted the eight men originally arrested for these crimes.

Defense counsels for Wilson and Tice noted at each of their trials that the DNA of each of the men was excluded from that found with the forensic DNA of Moore-Bosko and the crime scene. However, Hansen said that the lack of DNA evidence did not mean that these defendants were not at the scene, and they emphasized the recorded confessions of each man. The defense counsels noted that Ballard had confessed to having committed the rape and murder by himself, and that the police had said the apartment was not broken into, but the prosecution persisted in arguing there was a group attack.

In September 1999, Wilson was sentenced to eight and a half years. Because of widespread pre-trial publicity about the sensational case, Tice's defense counsels gained a change of venue to Alexandria, Virginia. Tice's trial started November 22, 1999, and he pleaded not guilty. Dick testified against him, but the only real evidence was his signed statement, which he had recanted.

Despite having confessed, at this trial, Ballard denied being involved in the crimes against Moore-Bosko. Judge Poston refused to allow the defense to introduce Ballard's previous confessions of March and April 1999 as the defendant had said on the stand that they were "lies." Poston refused to let James Broccoletti, Tice's attorney, question Ballard about his February 1999 confession letter or to introduce evidence related to his other crimes against women for which he was serving time. Poston also denied a defense motion to call an expert witness about false confessions but did allow the defense to question detective Glenn Ford about his interrogation techniques. Tice was found guilty of rape and capital murder in February 2000. In June 2000, he was sentenced to two consecutive life sentences.

After Tice's trial, on March 22, 2000, Ballard pleaded guilty to rape and murder of Moore-Bosko; he said he incriminated the Norfolk Four in his associated statement in exchange for a sentence of two life terms in prison after being threatened with the death penalty by the prosecution. He did not testify against Tice.

In 2001, Damian J. Hansen was transferred from Norfolk to the City of Chesapeake Commonwealth Attorney's Office, where he continued to prosecute the Norfolk Four cases as appeals and petitions for clemency were made. In 2013 he was Deputy Attorney of the office; Chesapeake is the third most-populous city of Virginia.

== Retrials, appeals, and release ==
Williams appealed his verdict to the Virginia court but was denied in 2000.

Tice appealed his conviction, and it was reversed in 2002 by the Virginia Court of Appeals. It ruled that Judge Charles Poston had not allowed Tice's attorney to question Ballard about his written confession. The case was remanded to the lower court.

During the January 2003 retrial of Tice, Judge Poston again presided. Dick testified against Tice again for the state, saying he and the other two men of the Four were involved in the attack. Judge Poston refused to allow Ballard's confession or statements to be introduced as evidence because he said they were not properly authenticated. He did allow Tice's defense attorney to read Ballard's February 1999 confession letter aloud. Tice was again convicted by a jury, and sentenced to two life sentences in prison.

== 2004 support by pro-bono lawyers and Innocence Project ==
The case of the Norfolk Four had attracted increasing attention and there was concern about the interrogations and convictions. Three major Washington, DC area law firms committed pro bono lawyers to provide counsel to each of the men in their appeals and other legal actions. Representatives of the Innocence Project also became involved.

Tice's second conviction was overturned on November 27, 2006, by a Virginia circuit court review on constitutional grounds, of lack of adequate defense counsel. Judge Everett A. Martin concluded that "the police violated the well-established rule that once a suspect has invoked his right to remain silent, the police must stop questioning." In addition, "‘There was no fingerprint, DNA, or other scientific evidence against [Tice], no independent eyewitnesses implicated him; no physical evidence implicated him,’ the judge explained. The judge concluded it was likely the jury would have acquitted Tice had the confession not been part of the trial evidence." The state appealed to the Virginia Supreme Court, which reaffirmed and thus reinstated the conviction.

Tice filed a petition for habeas corpus with a United States District Court. On September 14, 2009, U.S. District Judge Richard L. Williams vacated Tice's rape and murder convictions, on the grounds that Tice had been denied his constitutional right to effective counsel. On November 19, 2009, Judge Williams ruled that prosecutors could retry Tice. The state appealed the decision.

On April 20, 2011, the U.S. Court of Appeals for the Fourth Circuit affirmed Judge Williams' ruling to vacate Tice's convictions. Tice was freed later in 2011 after the Fourth Circuit ruled that the lower court should have thrown out Tice's confession.

Wilson had been released from prison in 2005 after completing his sentence. He was required to continue to register as a sex offender with local authorities for the rest of his life and had severe restrictions limiting where he could work and live. In March 2010, he asked the United States District Court for the Eastern District of Virginia for a writ of habeas corpus challenging his conviction. The court refused to hear Wilson's case, saying that since he was no longer in prison, on probation, on parole, or on supervised release, he was not in custody, and therefore could not petition for habeas. The Fourth Circuit also refused to hear the case.

In May 2010, former detective Robert Glenn Ford of Norfolk, who had retired, was indicted in Virginia in May 2010 on unrelated federal extortion charges of accepting payments over a period of years from criminal suspects in return for favorable treatment. He was found guilty in federal court of two of the four counts against him.

After the conviction of Ford, attorneys for the Norfolk Four called for full exoneration of their clients. In 2013, Yale Law School's Supreme Court Advocacy Clinic filed a petition for the US Supreme Court to clear Wilson's record of his crimes. Virginia Attorney General Ken Cuccinelli did not file a response, but the US Supreme Court ordered him to file a brief by April 25, 2013.

On June 24, 2013, Wilson's petition for a writ of certiorari to the Fourth Circuit Court of Appeals was denied. The case is Wilson v. Flaherty, No. 12-986.

On October 26, 2016, U.S. District Judge John A. Gibney Jr. ruled that "by any measure," the evidence showed that Danial Williams and Joseph J. Dick did not commit the rape and murder to which they each pleaded guilty, and "no sane human being" could convict them by the available evidence. After Virginia Attorney General Mark Herring "conceded errors in the initial investigation and withdrew his office’s long-standing opposition to their claims of innocence", Gibney vacated the convictions of Williams and Dick, and exonerated them. The state withdrew all charges against them.

By that time Tice's conviction had been overturned and he had been released from prison. As noted, Wilson's efforts to be formally declared innocent (to clear his name and be removed from the sex offender register) were rejected by the courts because he was no longer in custody.

== Clemency petitions filed in 2005; absolute pardons granted in 2017 ==
By 2005 the Norfolk Four had attracted support from the Innocence Project, and teams of pro bono attorneys from three different firms began to work on their legal appeals and clemency petitions. The work was supported by a 60-page report by the Academy Group, Inc., a Virginia forensic consulting firm. Based on its review of the evidence and confessions, it concluded that none of the Norfolk Four had been involved in the rape and murder of Moore-Bosko, and that Ballard was solely responsible as he had claimed.

That year attorneys for Dick, Tice, and Williams petitioned for clemency on November 10, 2005, from Virginia governor Mark Warner, as they were each serving life sentences. Warner did not rule on the petition, but it was considered by his successor, Governor Tim Kaine. Several retired FBI agents supported the men's claims of innocence, as did eleven of the jurors who had initially publicly convicted Tice and Wilson. These jurors submitted affidavits in support of the sailors' clemency request before the Virginia State Parole Board, saying that they believed the men were innocent. Eventually some "10 former state attorneys general, more than 20 former FBI agents and 13 original jurors in two of the cases" publicly supported their innocence.

On August 6, 2009, Kaine granted a conditional pardon to Dick, Tice, and Williams, which gained their release from prison. But this action did not vacate their convictions. As part of the conditional release, the three men, like Wilson, were still required to register with local authorities as sex offenders and felons, a requirement that meant they had to frequently return to update their records and had severe restrictions on work, movement, and where they could live.

As noted in the section above, the convictions of Williams and Dick were vacated by a federal court in October 2016, after evidentiary proceedings and the Virginia Attorney General's Office ended its opposition. Tice's conviction had already been overturned. In November 2016 the Virginia Attorney General instructed the Norfolk Police to videotape all interrogations and confessions in cases relating to homicides.

On March 21, 2017, Virginia Governor Terry McAuliffe granted absolute pardons to the Norfolk Four. These cleared their names and removed them from the sex offender and felon registers.

In a statement, a spokesman for the governor said:

"These pardons close the final chapter on a grave injustice that has plagued these 4 men for nearly 20 years. While former Governor Kaine had initially granted conditional pardons in the case, more exculpatory information discovered since then and detailed by Judge John Gibney during exhaustive evidentiary proceedings indicate that absolute pardons are appropriate."

The Norfolk Four filed a civil suit against the city and state for their wrongful convictions. In December 2018 both jurisdictions settled: the City of Norfolk agreed to $4.9 million in compensation and the state to an additional $3.5 million to be awarded in total to the four men.

== Representation in other media ==
- The case was featured in the 2001 episode of Forensic Files, entitled "Eight Men Out".
- Off Center Media made a video, "The Norfolk 4: A Miscarriage of Justice" (2005), used to support the defendants' petitions for clemency.
- Tom Wells and Richard A. Leo wrote a nonfiction book about these men and events, The Wrong Guys: Murder, False Confessions and the Norfolk Four (2009).
- John Grisham and Jim McCloskey wrote a nonfiction book, Framed: Astonishing True Stories of Wrongful Convictions, about 10 cases of wrongly convicted people, including the Norfolk Four.
- Frontline aired a documentary of the Norfolk Four called The Confessions on PBS on November 9, 2010.

== See also ==
- Central Park Five
- West Memphis Three
- Martinsville Seven
- False confession
- Innocence Project
- List of exonerated death row inmates
- List of wrongful convictions in the United States
- Richard Ofshe
