= List of Forensic Files episodes =

Title card for original show

Forensic Files (1996–2011) is an American documentary-style series which reveal how forensic science is used to solve violent crimes, mysterious accidents, and even outbreaks of illness. The original show is broadcast in syndication on multiple networks, is narrated by Peter Thomas, and is produced by Medstar Television. It has broadcast 406 episodes since its debut on TLC in 1996 as Medical Detectives.

== Series overview ==
Season	Episodes	Originally released	
Season	Episodes	First released	Last released
1	13	April 23, 1996	December 19, 1996
2	13	October 2, 1997	December 25, 1997
3	13	October 1, 1998	December 24, 1998
4	13	October 6, 1999	December 29, 1999
5	19	September 12, 2000	January 16, 2001
6	30	May 21, 2001	December 10, 2001
7	42	January 8, 2002	July 26, 2003
8	42	April 1, 2003	December 26, 2005
9	30	June 24, 2004	June 28, 2007
10	42	April 27, 2005	March 15, 2006
11	42	July 19, 2006	May 2, 2007
12	30	September 26, 2007	August 29, 2008
13	50	September 12, 2008	July 9, 2010
14	21	September 10, 2010	June 17, 2011
Specials	6	May 31, 2001	May 11, 2005

== Episodes ==
=== Season 1 (1996) ===
No. overall	No. in season	Title	Original release date
1	1	"The Disappearance of Helle Crafts"	April 23, 1996
2	2	"The Magic Bullet"	October 17, 1996
3	3	"The House that Roared"	October 10, 1996
4	4	"The Footpath Murders"	October 23, 1996
5	5	"Planted Evidence"	October 24, 1996
6	6	"Southside Strangler"	October 31, 1996
7	7	"Legionnaires' Disease"	November 7, 1996
8	8	"The Wilson Murder"	November 14, 1996
9	9	"Deadly Neighborhoods"	November 21, 1996
10	10	"Insect Clues"	November 28, 1996
11	11	"Outbreak"	December 5, 1996
12	12	"The List Murders"	December 12, 1996
13	13	"Raw Terror"	December 19, 1996

=== Season 2 (1997) ===
No. overall	No. in season	Title	Original release date
14	1	"The Common Thread"	October 2, 1997
15	2	"The Dirty Deed"	October 9, 1997
16	3	"Killer Fog"	October 16, 1997
17	4	"Sex, Lies and DNA"	October 23, 1997
18	5	"Bitter Potion"	October 30, 1997
19	6	"The Blood Trail"	November 6, 1997
20	7	"Fatal Fungus"	November 13, 1997
21	8	"Charred Remains"	November 20, 1997
22	9	"Something's Fishy"	November 27, 1997
23	10	"Sealed with a Kiss"	December 4, 1997
24	11	"Postal Mortem"	December 11, 1997
25	12	"Micro-Clues"	December 18, 1997
26	13	"Deadly Parasites"	December 25, 1997

=== Season 3 (1998) ===
No. overall	No. in season	Title	Original release date
27	1	"Without a Trace"	October 1, 1998
28	2	"Knot for Everyone"	October 8, 1998
29	3	"The Talking Skull"	October 15, 1998
30	4	"Foreign Body"	October 22, 1998
31	5	"Deadly Delivery"	October 29, 1998
32	6	"Similar Circumstances"	November 5, 1998
33	7	"Grave Evidence"	November 12, 1998
34	8	"Deadly Formula"	November 19, 1998
35	9	"Beaten by a Hair"	November 26, 1998
36	10	"Crime Seen"	December 3, 1998
37	11	"Speck of Evidence"	December 10, 1998
38	12	"Broken Bond"	December 17, 1998
39	13	"Out of the Ashes"	December 24, 1998

=== Season 4 (1999) ===
No. overall	No. in season	Title	Original release date
40	1	"Invisible Intruder"	October 6, 1999
41	2	"The Killing Room"	October 13, 1999
42	3	"Ultimate Betrayal"	October 20, 1999
43	4	"Cement the Case"	October 27, 1999
44	5	"Innocence Lost"	November 3, 1999
45	6	"'Til Death Do Us Part"	November 10, 1999
46	7	"Ties That Bind"	November 17, 1999
47	8	"Body of Evidence"	November 24, 1999
48	9	"Accident or Murder?"	December 1, 1999
49	10	"Core Evidence"	December 8, 1999
50	11	"Haunting Vision"	December 15, 1999
51	12	"With Every Breath"	December 22, 1999
52	13	"Slippery Motives"	December 29, 1999

=== Season 5 (2000–2001) ===
No. overall	No. in season	Title	Original release date
53	1	"Badge of Deceit"	September 12, 2000
54	2	"Dew Process"	September 19, 2000
55	3	"A Woman Scorned"	September 26, 2000
56	4	"A Voice from Beyond"	October 3, 2000
57	5	"Burning Ambition"	October 10, 2000
58	6	"Memories"	October 17, 2000
59	7	"Trail of Truth"	October 24, 2000
60	8	"Material Evidence"	October 31, 2000
61	9	"'Kill'igraphy"	November 7, 2000
62	10	"Nursery Crimes"	November 14, 2000
63	11	"Lasting Impression"	November 21, 2000
64	12	"Foundation of Lies"	November 28, 2000
65	13	"Unholy Vows"	December 5, 2000
66	14	"Broken Promises"	December 12, 2000
67	15	"Time Will Tell"	December 19, 2000
68	16	"Second Shot at Love"	December 26, 2000
69	17	"Journey to Justice"	January 2, 2001
70	18	"Video Diary"	January 9, 2001
71	19	"Deadly Knowledge"	January 16, 2001

=== Season 6 (2001) ===
No. overall	No. in season	Title	Original release date
72	1	"Missing in Time"	May 21, 2001
73	2	"Missing Pearl"	May 28, 2001
74	3	"Man's Best Friend?"	June 4, 2001
75	4	"Hand Delivered"	June 11, 2001
76	5	"Death Play"	June 18, 2001
77	6	"Fire Dot Com"	June 25, 2001
78	7	"Mistaken for Dead"	July 2, 2001
79	8	"Frozen Evidence"	July 9, 2001
80	9	"Soft Touch"	July 16, 2001
81	10	"Church Disappearance"	July 23, 2001
82	11	"Photo Finish"	July 30, 2001
83	12	"Whodunit"	August 6, 2001
84	13	"Horse Play"	August 13, 2001
85	14	"Treads and Threads"	August 20, 2001
86	15	"Killer's "Cattle" Log"	August 27, 2001
87	16	"Skin of Her Teeth"	September 3, 2001
88	17	"Line of Fire"	September 10, 2001
89	18	"Bad Blood"	September 17, 2001
90	19	"Pure Evil"	September 24, 2001
91	20	"Root of all Evil"	October 1, 2001
92	21	"Where the Blood Drops"	October 8, 2001
93	22	"Punch Line"	October 15, 2001
94	23	"Sibling Rivalry"	October 22, 2001
95	24	"Pastoral Care"	October 29, 2001
96	25	"Bagging a Killer"	November 5, 2001
97	26	"Double Trouble"	November 12, 2001
98	27	"Cats, Flies & Snapshots"	November 19, 2001
99	28	"Naked Justice"	November 26, 2001
100	29	"Treading Not So Lightly"	December 3, 2001
101	30	"Shopping Spree"	December 10, 2001

=== Season 7 (2002–2003) ===
No. overall	No. in season	Title	Original release date
102	1	"The Cheater"	October 12, 2002
103	2	"Forever Hold Your Peace"	January 8, 2002
104	3	"Reel Danger"	January 15, 2002
105	4	"Who's Your Daddy"	November 2, 2002
106	5	"The Alibi"	January 29, 2002
107	6	"A Bite Out of Crime"	February 5, 2002
108	7	"Purr-fect Match"	February 12, 2002
109	8	"Bio-Attack"	November 30, 2002
110	9	"A Shot in the Dark"	December 7, 2002
111	10	"Without a Prayer"	December 14, 2002
112	11	"A Clutch of Witnesses"	December 21, 2002
113	12	"Scout's Honor"	March 19, 2003
114	13	"A Touching Recollection"	March 26, 2003
115	14	"A Leg to Stand On"	January 11, 2003
116	15	"Partners in Crime"	January 18, 2003
117	16	"Within a Hair"	August 31, 2002
118	17	"Chief Evidence"	July 24, 2002
119	18	"A Bitter Pill to Swallow"	September 12, 2002
120	19	"Sip of Sins"	February 15, 2003
121	20	"Telltale Tracks"	August 27, 2002
122	21	"Ghost in the Machine"	March 1, 2003
123	22	"Frozen in Time"	March 8, 2003
124	23	"Cold Storage"	March 15, 2003
125	24	"The Metal Business"	September 26, 2002
126	25	"Dressed to Kill"	March 29, 2003
127	26	"Palm Print Conviction"	June 25, 2002
128	27	"A Vow of Silence"	October 10, 2002
129	28	"Elephant Tracks"	October 17, 2002
130	29	"A Bag of Evidence"	April 26, 2003
131	30	"Tooth or Consequences"	May 3, 2003
132	31	"The Sniffing Revenge"	May 10, 2003
133	32	"Sleight of Hand"	May 17, 2003
134	33	"Scratching the Surface"	May 24, 2003
135	34	"Fire Proof"	May 31, 2003
136	35	"X Marks the Spot"	June 7, 2003
137	36	"All Charged Up"	December 10, 2002
138	37	"Breaking the Mold"	December 11, 2002
139	38	"House Call"	June 28, 2003
140	39	"Marathon Man"	July 5, 2003
141	40	"The Sniper's Trail"	July 12, 2003
142	41	"Plastic Fire"	July 19, 2003
143	42	"Last Will"	July 26, 2003

=== Season 8 (2003) ===
No. overall	No. in season	Title	Original release date
144	1	"Dessert Served Cold"	April 1, 2003
145	2	"The Music Case"	February 10, 2004
146	3	"Paintball"	April 30, 2004
147	4	"Sign Here"	April 23, 2003
148	5	"Shadow of a Doubt"	April 29, 2003
149	6	"Tourist Trap"	June 4, 2003
150	7	"Once Bitten"	July 10, 2003
151	8	"All Wet"	August 15, 2003
152	9	"Shot of Vengeance"	September 20, 2003
153	10	"Dinner and a Movie"	October 26, 2003
154	11	"A Wrong Foot"	December 1, 2003
155	12	"Order Up"	January 6, 2004
156	13	"When the Dust Settled"	March 23, 2004
157	14	"A Welcome Intrusion"	March 18, 2004
158	15	"Within Arm's Reach"	April 23, 2004
159	16	"Private Thoughts"	August 26, 2004
160	17	"Brotherhoods"	November 29, 2004
161	18	"Hair of the Dog"	August 29, 2003
162	19	"Breaking News"	August 31, 2003
163	20	"All the World's a Stage"	September 3, 2003
164	21	"The Big Chill"	September 10, 2003
165	22	"Bound for Jail"	September 17, 2003
166	23	"Sphere of Influence"	September 20, 2003
167	24	"Nailed"	September 22, 2003
168	25	"Sign of the Zodiac"	April 18, 2005
169	26	"Letter Perfect"	December 10, 2003
170	27	"True Lies"	June 29, 2005
171	28	"Bed of Deceit"	August 4, 2005
172	29	"Smoke in your Eyes"	September 9, 2005
173	30	"Flower Power"	October 15, 2005
174	31	"Past Lives"	November 20, 2005
175	32	"Over and Out"	December 26, 2005
176	33	"Death by a Salesman"	January 31, 2005
177	34	"Web of Seduction"	March 8, 2005
178	35	"Grounds for Indictment"	December 2, 2004
179	36	"Duelling Confessions"	May 31, 2005
180	37	"Traces of Truth"	June 24, 2004
181	38	"Honor thy Father"	May 19, 2004
182	39	"Hack Attack"	September 4, 2005
183	40	"Deadly Curve"	October 10, 2004
184	41	"Visibility Zero"	November 15, 2004
185	42	"Flashover"	December 21, 2004

=== Season 9 (2004–2005) ===
No. overall	No. in season	Title	Original release date
186	1	"Road Rage"	June 2, 2004
187	2	"Hunter or Hunted"	June 9, 2004
188	3	"In Harm's Way"	June 15, 2004
189	4	"No Corpus Delicti"	June 21, 2004
190	5	"News at 11"	June 27, 2004
191	6	"Burning Desire"	July 28, 2004
192	7	"Cloak of Deceit"	July 9, 2004
193	8	"Bad Medicine"	July 8, 2004
194	9	"Stick 'em Up"	June 21, 2007
195	10	"Head Games"	July 22, 2004
196	11	"Making the Collar"	June 28, 2007
197	12	"The Financial Downfall"	August 11, 2004
198	13	"A Daughter's Journey"	August 23, 2004
199	14	"Over a Barrel"	August 24, 2004
200	15	"Pinned by the Evidence"	August 24, 2004
201	16	"Cries Unheard"	August 25, 2004
202	17	"Buried Treasure"	August 26, 2004
203	18	"Badge of Betrayal"	September 22, 2004
204	19	"Deadly Matrimony"	September 29, 2004
205	20	"Muddy Waters"	October 13, 2004
206	21	"Point of Origin"	October 27, 2004
207	22	"Seeds for Doubt"	October 7, 2004
208	23	"Saving Face"	October 13, 2004
209	24	"Northern Exposure"	December 8, 2004
210	25	"Silk Stalkings"	December 29, 2004
211	26	"Fishing for the Truth"	October 31, 2004
212	27	"For Love or Money"	January 19, 2005
213	28	"South of the Border"	February 2, 2005
214	29	"The Stake-Out"	July 4, 2004
215	30	"Walking Terror"	March 2, 2005

=== Season 10 (2005–2006) ===
No. overall	No. in season	Title	Original release date
216	1	"Trial By Fire"	April 27, 2005
217	2	"Marked For Life"	May 18, 2005
218	3	"Plastic Puzzle"	June 1, 2005
219	4	"Up In Smoke"	June 29, 2005
220	5	"Soiled Plan"	July 6, 2005
221	6	"Headquarters"	July 13, 2005
222	7	"One For The Road"	July 20, 2005
223	8	"Army Of Evidence"	July 27, 2005
224	9	"Shear Luck"	August 3, 2005
225	10	"Tagging A Suspect"	August 10, 2005
226	11	"Strong Impressions"	August 17, 2005
227	12	"Cereal Killer"	August 24, 2005
228	13	"Crash Course"	August 31, 2005
229	14	"A Leg Up On Crime"	September 7, 2005
230	15	"Tight-fitting Genes"	September 14, 2005
231	16	"Deadly Valentine"	September 21, 2005
232	17	"Picture This"	September 28, 2005
233	18	"Oily In The Morning"	October 5, 2005
234	19	"Gold Rush"	October 12, 2005
235	20	"Four On The Floor"	October 19, 2005
236	21	"Writer's Block"	October 26, 2005
237	22	"A Clean Getaway"	November 2, 2005
238	23	"Prints Among Thieves"	November 9, 2005
239	24	"Unholy Alliance"	November 16, 2005
240	25	"Signed, Sealed & Delivered"	November 23, 2005
241	26	"Cop Out"	November 30, 2005
242	27	"Summer Obsession"	December 7, 2005
243	28	"Elemental Clue"	December 14, 2005
244	29	"Moss, Not Grass"	December 21, 2005
245	30	"Material Witness"	December 28, 2005
246	31	"Garden of Evil"	January 4, 2006
247	32	"Sunday School Ambush"	January 11, 2006
248	33	"Penchant for Poison"	January 18, 2006
249	34	"Bump in the Night"	January 25, 2006
250	35	"Sole Searching"	February 1, 2006
251	36	"Murder on the Menu"	February 8, 2006
252	37	"Hot on the Trail"	February 15, 2006
253	38	"High 'n Dry"	February 22, 2006
254	39	"To the Viktor"	March 1, 2006
255	40	"Wired for Disaster"	March 8, 2006
256	41	"Wood-be Killer"	March 15, 2006
257	42	"Enemy Within"	December 7, 2005

=== Season 11 (2006–2007) ===
No. overall	No. in season	Title	Original release date
258	1	"Naughty or Nyce"	July 19, 2006
259	2	"Going for Broke"	July 26, 2006
260	3	"Just Desserts"	August 2, 2006
261	4	"Sunday's Wake"	August 9, 2006
262	5	"Shattered Dreams"	August 16, 2006
263	6	"Dockter Visit"	August 23, 2006
264	7	"Murder, She Wrote"	August 30, 2006
265	8	"Concrete Alibi"	September 6, 2006
266	9	"Key Evidence"	September 13, 2006
267	10	"The Gambler"	September 20, 2006
268	11	"Weakest Link"	September 27, 2006
269	12	"Capitol Crimes"	October 4, 2006
270	13	"Undertaken"	October 11, 2006
271	14	"Dark Waters"	October 18, 2006
272	15	"Nice Threads"	October 25, 2006
273	16	"Grave Danger"	November 1, 2006
274	17	"Internal Affair"	November 8, 2006
275	18	"A Case of the Flue"	November 15, 2006
276	19	"No Safe Place"	November 22, 2006
277	20	"Live Wire"	November 29, 2006
278	21	"Van-ished"	December 6, 2006
279	22	"A Novel Idea"	December 13, 2006
280	23	"Chief Suspect"	December 20, 2006
281	24	"Water Hazard"	December 27, 2006
282	25	"Shell Game"	January 3, 2007
283	26	"Ring Him Up"	January 10, 2007
284	27	"Killer Impression"	January 17, 2007
285	28	"If I Were You"	January 24, 2007
286	29	"As the Tide Turns"	January 31, 2007
287	30	"A Tight Leash"	February 7, 2007
288	31	"Muffled Cries"	February 14, 2007
289	32	"Critical Maneuver"	February 21, 2007
290	33	"Skirting the Evidence"	February 28, 2007
291	34	"Small Town Terror"	March 7, 2007
292	35	"Fresh Heir"	March 14, 2007
293	36	"Ticker Tape"	March 21, 2007
294	37	"Step by Step"	March 28, 2007
295	38	"Blanket of Evidence"	April 4, 2007
296	39	"Fired-Up"	April 11, 2007
297	40	"Two in a Million"	April 18, 2007
298	41	"Bitter Brew"	April 25, 2007
299	42	"Message in a Bottle"	May 2, 2007

=== Season 12 (2007–2008) ===
No. overall	No. in season	Title	Original release date
300	1	"Sharper Image"	September 26, 2007
301	2	"Insulated Evidence"	October 3, 2007
302	3	"Cold Hearted"	October 10, 2007
303	4	"Wheel of Misfortune"	October 24, 2007
304	5	"Quite a Spectacle"	October 31, 2007
305	6	"Transaction Failed"	November 7, 2007
306	7	"The Day the Music Died"	November 14, 2007
307	8	"Sole Survivor"	November 19, 2007
308	9	"Insignificant Others"	December 10, 2007
309	10	"Catch 22"	December 17, 2007
310	11	"A Cinderella Story"	December 24, 2007
311	12	"Screen Pass"	January 7, 2008
312	13	"Pressed for Crime"	January 14, 2008
313	14	"Finger Pane"	January 21, 2008
314	15	"Good as Gold"	January 28, 2008
315	16	"Freedom Fighter"	June 13, 2008
316	17	"Dog Day Afternoon"	February 25, 2008
317	18	"Shattered Innocence"	March 9, 2008
318	19	"All Butt Certain"	March 14, 2008
319	20	"Jean Pool"	April 18, 2008
320	21	"Traffic Violations"	May 9, 2008
321	22	"Brotherly Love"	May 23, 2008
322	23	"Disrobed"	June 6, 2008
323	24	"Driven to Silence"	June 20, 2008
324	25	"Printed Proof"	June 28, 2008
325	26	"About Face"	July 18, 2008
326	27	"In the Bag"	July 25, 2008
327	28	"Yes, In Deed"	August 8, 2008
328	29	"Guarded Secrets"	August 22, 2008
329	30	"Smoking Out a Killer"	August 29, 2008

=== Season 13 (2008–2010) ===
No. overall	No. in season	Title	Original release date
330	1	"Frozen Assets"	September 12, 2008
331	2	"House Hunting"	September 19, 2008
332	3	"Shoot to Thrill"	October 3, 2008
333	4	"Political Thriller"	October 10, 2008
334	5	"Double Cross"	October 24, 2008
335	6	"Dancing with the Devil"	October 31, 2008
336	7	"Last Dance"	November 14, 2008
337	8	"Constructive Criticism"	November 21, 2008
338	9	"Home Evasion"	December 5, 2008
339	10	"Window Watcher"	December 12, 2008
340	11	"Stranger in the Night"	December 19, 2008
341	12	"Kidnapping"	January 9, 2009
342	13	"Sands of Crime"	January 16, 2009
343	14	"Calculated Coincidence"	February 6, 2009
344	15	"Sworded Scheme"	January 30, 2009
345	16	"Unmasked"	February 20, 2009
346	17	"Fashion Police"	March 13, 2009
347	18	"Church Dis-service"	April 3, 2009
348	19	"Seedy Intentions"	April 17, 2009
349	20	"DNA Dragnet"	May 15, 2009
350	21	"Smiley Face"	May 22, 2009
351	22	"Dirty Laundry"	June 5, 2009
352	23	"Drowning Sorrows"	June 12, 2009
353	24	"As Fault"	June 19, 2009
354	25	"Family Ties"	July 17, 2009
355	26	"Trouble Brewing"	July 24, 2009
356	27	"Holy Terror"	August 14, 2009
357	28	"Needle in a Haystack"	August 28, 2009
358	29	"Room With A View"	September 11, 2009
359	30	"Dollars and Sense"	September 25, 2009
360	31	"Hair Line"	October 2, 2009
361	32	"All That Glitters is Gold"	October 16, 2009
362	33	"Deadly Rebellion"	October 30, 2009
363	34	"Sign of the Crime"	November 13, 2009
364	35	"Covet Thy Neighbor"	November 20, 2009
365	36	"Writing on the Wall"	December 4, 2009
366	37	"Hundreds of Reasons"	December 11, 2009
367	38	"Cold Feet"	December 18, 2009
368	39	"Separation Anxiety"	January 8, 2010
369	40	"Office Visit"	March 5, 2010
370	41	"Palm Saturday"	March 12, 2010
371	42	"Shoe-In for Murder"	March 19, 2010
372	43	"Family Interrupted"	April 2, 2010
373	44	"Runaway Love"	April 16, 2010
374	45	"Watchful Eye"	April 30, 2010
375	46	"Waste Mis-Management"	May 14, 2010
376	47	"Dirty Little Secret"	May 28, 2010
377	48	"Lights Out"	June 11, 2010
378	49	"Pet Rock"	June 25, 2010
379	50	"Best Foot Forward"	July 9, 2010

=== Season 14 (2010–2011) ===
No. overall	No. in season	Title	Original release date
380	1	"Purebread Murder"	September 10, 2010
381	2	"Hear No Evil"	September 24, 2010
382	3	"Hell's Kitchen"	October 8, 2010
383	4	"Three's a Crowd"	October 22, 2010
384	5	"A Squire's Riches"	November 5, 2010
385	6	"Home of the Brave"	November 19, 2010
386	7	"Freeze Framed"	December 3, 2010
387	8	"Touch of Evil"	December 17, 2010
388	9	"Textbook Murder"	December 31, 2010
389	10	"Filtered Out"	January 14, 2011
390	11	"Water Logged"	January 28, 2011
391	12	"Social Circle"	February 11, 2011
392	13	"Low Maintenance"	February 25, 2011
393	14	"Fate Date"	March 11, 2011
394	15	"Trail of a Killer"	March 25, 2011
395	16	"Gone Ballistic"	April 8, 2011
396	17	"Seeing Red"	April 22, 2011
397	18	"Auto-Motive"	May 6, 2011
398	19	"Skeleton Key"	May 20, 2011
399	20	"Funeral Services"	June 3, 2011
400	21	"Expert Witness"	June 17, 2011

=== Specials ===
Following the move of the show from TLC to CourtTV in 2000, TLC managed to produce four hour-long specials, "Payback", "The Buddhist Monk Murders", "Eight Men Out", and "See No Evil", but under the original Medical Detectives title. The first four specials do not feature narration by Peter Thomas due to a contract negotiation that wouldn't allow him to record episodes for TLC anymore. Instead, they were narrated by Peter Dean. Following their original broadcasts, three of these episodes did not air again until 2016, when they were broadcast on the HLN Network under the Forensic Files title. The last two specials, "JFK Assassination" and "The Lindbergh Baby Kidnapping" aired on CourtTV with Peter Thomas narrating under the title: Forensic Files Special.

No.	Title	Original release date
1	"Payback"	May 31, 2001 (TLC); February 27, 2016 (HLN)
This episode covers the 1993 disappearance and murder of twenty-year-old Bobby Kent in Weston, Florida, whose death was the work of seven people. The case, which became well known, is also the subject of a book and a movie.
2	"Eight Men Out"	June 7, 2001 (TLC)
A young sailor named Billy Bosko married his high school sweetheart, Michelle Moore Bosko. When he returns to his home port of Norfolk, Virginia on July 8, 1997, he finds his 19-year-old bride lying on the floor in a pool of blood. She had been raped and murdered. The police investigation focuses on a neighbor, who confesses. But his DNA does not match the killer's. That begins a series of police interrogations and 'confessions', all of which are in conflict with the forensic evidence. Four men are eventually sent to prison. Three others are accused. Finally, an eighth man confesses in a letter, and his is the only DNA that matches. Defense investigators and others wonder why were the other men accused and sent to prison.
3	"See No Evil"	June 14, 2001 (TLC); May 21, 2016 (HLN)
Beginning in December 1990, police uncover a string of murdered prostitutes. Each victim has had her eyes carved out. Charles Albright was eventually convicted of murder in 1991.
4	"The Buddhist Monk Murders"	October 22, 2001 (TLC); September 17, 2016 (HLN)
Several monks are massacred at a Buddhist temple in Arizona in 1991. Four men from Tucson, referred to as the "Tucson Four", were initially charged with the crime and gave confessions under controversial conditions, including the actual murder weapon – connected to unassociated individuals who were ignored by authorities – being left untested by the sheriff's department. However, the "Tucson Four" later recanted the confessions and were released when investigators finally confirmed that they had nothing to do with the murders. Local teenagers Johnathan Doody and Allessandro Garcia were arrested and imprisoned.
5	"The JFK Assassination: Investigation Reopened"	November 19, 2003
Over 40 years after the 1963 assassination of president John F. Kennedy, a majority of Americans still believe that there was a cover-up. Was Lee Harvey Oswald the sole gunman? Could one bullet pass through both the president and governor John Connally? Does a police radio recording hold the truth?
6	"The Lindbergh Baby Kidnapping: Investigation Reopened"	May 11, 2005
The 1932 kidnapping of Charles Lindbergh, Jr. is reviewed.
