= Medstar Television =

American television production company

Medstar Television Inc.
- Company type: Production company
- Industry: Television
- Founded: 1981
- Founders: Paul Dowling; William Ferretti
- Headquarters: Allentown, Pennsylvania, United States
- Website: Medstar Television

Medstar Television Inc. is a television production company based in Allentown, Pennsylvania.

== History and founding ==
Medstar was incorporated in Pennsylvania in 1981 by Paul Dowling and William Ferretti to produce medical news and health information. Medstar financed, produced, and distributed all of its own productions.

== Productions ==
One of its first was Health Matters, a program on health and lifestyle issues, produced in cooperation with hospitals throughout the United States, which sponsor the program in their local areas with local and national content, along the same lines as PM Magazine. Health Matters was syndicated to various commercial and PBS stations during the 1980s.

Medstar later expanded to produce two medical news products, "MedstarSource" and "MedstarAdvances" syndicated to commercial television stations in the United States. Production of these segments ended in August 2011.

In 1990, Medstar began to produce programming for cable television including the Discovery Channel, HBO, and TLC.

In 1995, the company created the Medical Detectives series on forensic science, which premiered on TLC in April 1995. It was the first reality-based forensic series on television and used a 'murder mystery' approach to documentary storytelling. In 2000 the Medical Detectives series moved to the CourtTV network, now named TruTV, where it was re-titled Forensic Files and quickly became the network's highest rated television series.

Internationally, the series was sold to stations and networks in over 142 countries, where it remains popular. Peter Thomas narrated the series, with more than 400 episodes.

In 2002, Forensic Files appeared as a summer replacement series on NBC, the first prime time television series originally produced for cable to air on a commercial network.
