= Forensic Files =

American documentary TV series (1996–2011)

- Title card, seasons 7–14
- Also known as: Medical Detectives (1996–1999); Mystery Detectives (2009–2012 re-runs); Murder Detectives (United Kingdom); Forensic Files: Digital Details; Cause of Death
- Genre: Documentary; True crime
- Created by: Paul Dowling
- Starring: Various
- Narrated by: Peter Thomas (1996–2011); Peter Dean (2001; specials only)
- Country of origin: United States
- Original language: English
- No. of seasons: 14
- No. of episodes: 406, including six hour-long specials (list of episodes)

Production
- Running time: 22 minutes (episodes only); 44 minutes (specials only)
- Production companies: Medstar Television; Trifecta Entertainment & Media (syndication)

Original release
- Network: TLC (1996–1999); Court TV (2000–2007); truTV (2008–2011)
- Release: April 23, 1996 – June 17, 2011

Forensic Files, originally known as Medical Detectives, is an American documentary television program that reveals how forensic science is used to solve violent crimes, mysterious accidents, and outbreaks of illness. The show was originally broadcast on TLC, moving to Court TV – and changing to its current name – starting with its fifth season. It is narrated by Peter Thomas, produced by Medstar Television, and distributed by FilmRise, in association with truTV Original Productions. It broadcast 406 episodes from its debut on TLC in 1996 until its final episode in 2011. Reruns shown on HLN were initially retitled Mystery Detectives before settling on the main title of the show in 2014.

A version of the program was broadcast on Five in the United Kingdom, under the name Murder Detectives. Most of the 400 episodes are also available on the "FilmRise True Crime" channel that is managed by distributor FilmRise.

On October 1, 2019, HLN announced it had greenlit a revival of the show, titled Forensic Files II, which began airing on February 23, 2020. Due to long-time narrator Peter Thomas' death, the show is narrated by Bill Camp. After Forensic Files II entered hiatus in 2024, it was announced in October 2026 that a 20 episode revival of Forensic Files was to enter production with Radial Entertainment and Content Partners producing.

== Overview ==
The show helped pioneer documentary-style crime-science shows. Its website says it profiles "puzzling, often baffling cases whose riddles are ultimately solved by forensic detection." The cases and people are real. Scientists and forensic experts in many fields are interviewed.

Not every case is a crime. In some cases, the investigation reveals that the suspects are innocent, and that a death was an accident or suicide. Several episodes profile people who have been jailed for or convicted of a crime and ultimately exonerated by forensic evidence. Other episodes focus on accidents where consulted experts relied on forensic evidence to explain why the incident occurred, such as the 1987 King's Cross fire and the 1993 Big Bayou Canot train wreck. Many of the accident investigation episodes were originally broadcast as a separate CourtTV program, Extreme Evidence, but are now rerun under the Forensic Files name and included in the Mystery Detectives rebranding.

Although Medical Detectives also showed episodes about how outbreaks of mysterious illnesses were tracked (such as Hantavirus and Legionellosis), most of them have been dropped in favor of episodes about criminal cases (and occasionally civil cases).

== Ownership and distribution ==
In 2024, Content Partners LLC, a company focused on film and television intellectual property, acquired the catalog of the original series Forensic Files, including 400 episodes, as well as international distribution rights to Forensic Files II.

Following the acquisition, Content Partners announced several licensing and distribution initiatives related to the series. In 2025, the company announced a licensing agreement with NBCUniversal's Oxygen network to bring Forensic Files to the channel.

Content Partners also announced plans to adapt 15 episodes of Forensic Files into a vertical video format through GammaTime and partnered with FilmRise to update episodes of the original series in high definition using artificial intelligence technology.

== Episodes ==
Season	Episodes	Originally released	
Season	Episodes	First released	Last released
1	13	April 23, 1996	December 19, 1996
2	13	October 2, 1997	December 25, 1997
3	13	October 1, 1998	December 24, 1998
4	13	October 6, 1999	December 29, 1999
5	19	September 12, 2000	January 16, 2001
6	30	May 21, 2001	December 10, 2001
7	42	January 8, 2002	July 26, 2003
8	42	April 1, 2003	December 26, 2005
9	30	June 24, 2004	June 28, 2007
10	42	April 27, 2005	March 15, 2006
11	42	July 19, 2006	May 2, 2007
12	30	September 26, 2007	August 29, 2008
13	50	September 12, 2008	July 9, 2010
14	21	September 10, 2010	June 17, 2011
Specials	6	May 31, 2001	May 11, 2005

== Narration and cast ==
Not every episode of Forensic Files was narrated by Peter Thomas, a well-known voice-over talent. Four special hour-long episodes ("Payback", "Eight Men Out", "See No Evil", and "The Buddhist Monk Murders") were narrated by Peter Dean due to a scheduling conflict. These episodes were originally broadcast on TLC in 2001 and all except for one ("Eight Men Out") aired for the first time on the HLN Network in 2016.

Each episode includes interviews with witnesses, investigators, and forensic scientists. Many of the world's foremost forensic analysts have appeared on the show (often in more than one episode), including Henry Lee, Cyril Wecht, William M. Bass, Alec Jeffreys, Skip Palenik, and Richard Souviron.

For the dramatic recreations, lookalike actors and models resembling the main figures in the story were found through a casting company in Allentown, Pennsylvania, or through open casting calls in New York and other cities.

== Production and title sequences ==
Title card used during seasons 5 through 6 (including the retitled Medical Detectives episodes)

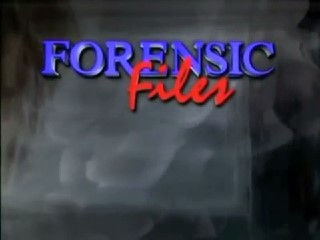
A slightly altered title display of the one above used for episodes "Reel Danger" and "The Alibi" of Season 7

The program began on the TLC Network in April 1996 as Medical Detectives. Old episodes of Medical Detectives now air on TruTV under the Forensic Files label. Overseas, the show airs under these two titles, and others, on various channels in over 100 countries. It is distributed by CABLEready.

For the first four seasons under the Medical Detectives name, the format of the show was generally the same as it would be in later seasons under its "Forensic Files" name, but there were slight differences. During the opening credits and after the title display of the show, the titles of the episodes appeared and they were each displayed distinctively. For example, "The Disappearance of Helle Crafts" depicted a jigsaw puzzle coming together that displayed a picture of Helle Crafts and this picture lead into the episode (under the Forensic Files name, this picture was replaced with another), and "Raw Terror" depicted the words in big red letters against a black screen. The titles were sometimes featured in a visual representation to accommodate the subject at hand. For example, "The Southside Strangler" depicted black and white buildings coming down the screen; the buildings were displayed there in order to represent the "southside" of wherever the crime happened in and Season 2's "The Common Thread" displayed the title through a use of small "thread" strands that dangled in full-view and formed the title. The re-enactment scenes for the first couple of seasons were displayed in black and white and an eerie music score with a tunnel-like echo voice was used in order to provide a more terrifying feel to the show.

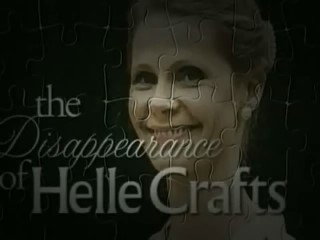
The original "puzzle piece" title layout of the first episode when the show aired as Medical Detectives

When CourtTV acquired the rights to the show for its fifth season, the decision was made to rename the show Forensic Files in order to emphasize the forensic science that was performed on the cases and connect it better with other documentary/reenactment crime shows with a similar title such as The FBI Files and Cold Case Files. A new opening was produced for Seasons 5 and 6 (and a couple in Season 7) and it depicted footage from the first four seasons. The title display "Forensic Files" is depicted in big blue and red letters with a background light beaming across the "Forensic" part. This opening was later used for the Medical Detectives episodes, removing their original openings and distinctive title displays. 6 episodes (The Footpath Murders, Raw Terror, Deadly Neighborhoods, Sealed with a Kiss, Deadly Parasites, and Foreign Body) were never incorporated under the Forensic Files name due to CourtTV's desire to have the show focus on crime-related episodes instead of disease outbreaks or medical mysteries. Several others were also not brought over due to featuring extremely graphic crime scene photos. These episodes are unavailable on streaming or DVD, and can be seen via secondary copies online only under its original format when they were aired as Medical Detectives.

As of September 2024, the episodes "The Footpath Murders", Raw Terror", ''Sealed with a Kiss" and Deadly Parasites was finally included on the FilmRise distribution YouTube channel under the ''Forensic File'' name, though first two episodes listed still includes the Medical Detectives style name plate design for those interviewed than what would be featured on the Forensic Files rebranding.

In Season 7, a new opening sequence was made with an entirely new theme song, providing a more tech-based feel and featuring a new title format. The titles of the episodes are quickly scanned underneath the title displays. No footage from actual episodes is used and everything displayed was made exclusively for the opening. This opening was used on a number of rebranded Medical Detectives episodes; replacing the opening for Seasons 5 and 6 that was originally given to them. Episodes such as "The Southside Strangler" and "Legionnaires' Disease" can be seen with all three openings. Season 7's "Reel Danger" can be seen with two.

By Season 12, starting with the twentieth episode, the opening sequence was shortened entirely and as a result, just the title of the show is featured and the title of the episode displayed beneath it. The episodes from here on out now had a faster-paced opening preview of the episode with upbeat music and Peter Thomas starting off saying "Up Next...".

On October 1, 2019, HLN announced it had acquired the broadcasting rights from Medstar Television to produce a revival of the series, with the first season consisting of 16 half-hour episodes. The new show is titled Forensic Files II, and the first episode aired on February 23, 2020, with Bill Camp serving as the new narrator.

== Show format ==
The show takes a "whodunit" approach, making each case a mystery that needs to be solved. Every half-hour episode follows one case from its initial investigation until the suspect(s) conviction, acquittal, or some other legal resolution. Pathologists, medical examiners, police officers, detectives, prosecutors, defense attorneys, friends and families of victims or suspects (if their cooperation is given) are all interviewed about their roles.

Video footage of the lab tests is shot in a modernistic film noir style, in dark, moodily lit settings with odd, glowing colors. The crimes and parts of the investigation are re-enacted with actors in dramatic recreations. These recreations are indicated by a change to a "filmized" look, as is done with many crime re-enactment shows. These recreations sometimes include alternate versions of the crime, which are eventually disproven by the science. This technique would later be appropriated, in a modified form, by the CBS television series CSI: Crime Scene Investigation—essentially a fictionalized big-budget version of Forensic Files. During the original run of the show as Medical Detectives, eerie vocal music was matched with the recreations in order to create a frightening atmosphere. This specific effect was discontinued after the move to Court TV.

For privacy considerations, the names of some victims and their families are changed, and case evidence featured within the show is re-created in order to protect their true identities. That is unless consent is given by the persons who are being spoken to, the show is not allowed to use the family's (or families') real name(s).

In 2006, Forensic Files "Advanced" episodes aired, which had older episodes interspersed with Pop-Up Video style factoids about the cases which were then being featured.

Sometimes, another case is mentioned which is similar to the one being aired. For example: "Cold Hearted" on "Freeze Framed" and "Past Lives" on "A Squire's Riches". In another episode that involves DNA evidence, the name of a man shown on an older episode was mentioned again and this time he was revealed to have been the first person put to death in the United States based on DNA evidence.

On re-runs of episodes on HLN, an update of the case is given on the criminals that were alive at the time the episodes were aired (deaths, paroles, releases, etc.).

== Broadcast run and alternative titles ==
Premiering just as the O. J. Simpson murder trial had focused attention on the world of DNA and forensics, Medical Detectives became a hit. It was one of the first of the popular forensic science shows. A few years later, Court TV acquired rights to broadcast the show and it quickly became the cornerstone of its primetime schedule, increasing its annual production run to 42 episodes. The show was retained after the network was renamed TruTV in 2008.

The show was so successful that, in 2002, NBC aired it as a summer replacement series, one of the first times in which a program produced for cable television was aired by a broadcast network in prime-time.

In 2009, truTV's sister network Turner Network Television ("TNT") began airing episodes in HD on Wednesday nights for the month of December.

The vast majority of the shows are in a half-hour format. However, some hour-long specials have been produced. Several of these have re-investigated famous cases such as The Norfolk Four, or even historic murders such as the Lindbergh kidnapping and the John F. Kennedy assassination.

Reruns were aired on Lifetime in the fall of 2011 under the Medical Detectives moniker. A year later, in October 2012, HLN began airing the reruns under the title Mystery Detectives. Beginning in January 2014, HLN switched to the "Forensic Files" title. On that network, it is increasingly being used to fill many time slots due to program cancellations by budget cuts. By 2016, the program took up about 58% of the entire HLN channel each week. In June 2014, the program aired nightly from 2am through 5am on CNN, before being removed due to industry and viewer criticism, along with continuing international breaking news events, and replaced with a CNN International simulcast. Since November 7, 2015, HLN has retitled the program "Forensic Files: Digital Details" and aired episodes that did not air on the channel before. The show led HLN in ratings in early 2015.

TruTV currently still holds the licensing rights to the Forensic Files name. The reruns were repackaged with a shorter intro, and (at the end of some episodes) updates on what became of the suspect(s) or parties involved since the final verdicts. (For example: At the end of the 1996 episode "The List Murders", it is mentioned that John List, convicted of murdering his entire family in 1971 and sentenced to life in prison, died in 2008.) In late 2014, Investigation Discovery started airing episodes under the "Cause of Death" title. Reruns of the show also were formerly carried over-the-air on Court TV, sister channel Ion Mystery, AMGTV and currently on True Crime Network and in off-network syndication. As of 2022 the entire catalog of Forensic Files is available on Peacock, while a "Best of Forensic Files" series is available on Amazon Prime. It also currently has its own channel on Pluto TV.

HLN advertised "brand new episodes of Forensic Files" intermittently since 2014, when the advertised "new" episodes are actually just old episodes that had never aired on the network before and were new to HLN. The advertisement of these episodes caused confusion, with some viewers taking to Twitter to ask the show's creator, Paul Dowling, if the show was going back into production. The show's narrator, Peter Thomas, died on April 30, 2016, five years after the program went out of production. Dowling stated that Thomas "can't be replaced," thus eliminating any hopes of reviving the program. Despite this, the program was revived for an additional season for February 2020. Bill Camp was chosen to succeed Thomas as the show's narrator.

== Home media ==
In 2004, Court TV released a limited number of episodes on DVD. As of June 26, 2009, Amazon.com says the DVD has been discontinued by the manufacturer.

In August 2011, TGG Direct released 8 DVD collections each containing 12 episodes. These collections include "Historic Cases", "Convictions Overturned", "Death By Poison", "Crimes of Passion", "Kidnapping Cases", "Medical Mysteries", "Serial Killers" and "Sex Crimes".

As of February 2020, Netflix in the U.S. is streaming most of the 406 episodes, split into 9 collections; seasons 7–9 and 11–14 are also available on Hulu. The latter also planned to stream Forensic Files II on its premium subscription service.

== Reception ==
This basic cable offering has been reviewed infrequently by television critics. In August 2002, The Houston Chronicle compared it to an episode of Unsolved Mysteries: "A criminal story is told – the more bizarre the better; a mysterious element is introduced; and forensic experts solve the mystery. All that's missing is Robert Stack."

The Los Angeles Times gave this review in April 2001: "Although Forensic Files ably extends this specialized field to the masses and deploys its slick reenactments effectively, its jarring voice-over is the overcooked antithesis of the meticulous science it depicts."

== Forensic Files II ==
The new series, which had premiered its second season on July 11, 2021, uses the same formula as the original, though with a new narrator, Bill Camp. "We are telling the same kinds of stories in the same way," Executive Producer Nancy Duffy said in an interview. Instead of hiring actors to play the fictional roles, however, the new series uses "employees of CNN and HLN".

Forensic Files II began airing on February 23, 2020, and as of its fourth season broadcast in 2023, remains in an indefinite hiatus.

== Other media ==
Cover of the first Forensic Files DVD

The Official Forensic Files Casebook was published in 2004. The book recaps and expounds on some episodes, explains how the show is produced, and details why some proposed episodes were turned down. In it, the show's Executive Producer/Writer Paul Dowling says he was inspired to create the show because he had been present in Philadelphia during the outbreak of Legionellosis in 1976, as well as by the murder of Helle Crafts. The CDC's legionellosis investigation eventually became an episode of Medical Detectives, while the Crafts case was filmed as the program's pilot episode.

In January 2020, Forensic Files Podcast debuted and featured audio from a selection of the Forensic Files airings.

== See also ==
- Brian Keith Lord
- The New Detectives
