= Peter Thomas (announcer) =

American voice-over artist (1924–2016)

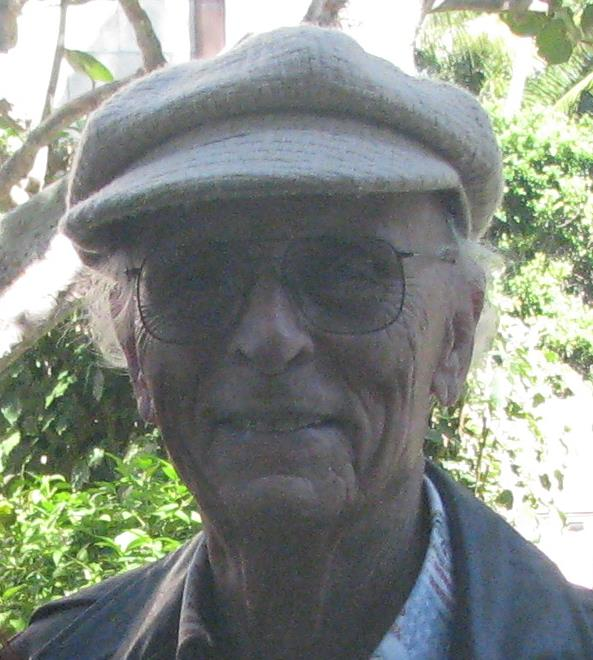
- Thomas in 2010
- Born: Peter Addenbrooke Thomas; June 28, 1924; Pensacola, Florida, U.S.
- Died: April 30, 2016 (aged 91); Naples, Florida, U.S.
- Occupation: Narrator
- Years active: 1938–2016
- Known for: Documentary and advertisement voice-over work
- Spouse: Stella Barrineau (m. 1946; died 2014)
- Children: 3
- Military service
- Allegiance: United States of America
- Branch: United States Army
- Unit: 1st Infantry Division
- Conflicts: World War II; Battle of Normandy; Battle of the Bulge
- Awards: Bronze Star; Purple Heart; Croix de Guerre; Belgian Fourragère

Peter Addenbrooke Thomas (June 28, 1924 – April 30, 2016) was an American announcer and narrator of television programs and advertisements. Possessing a "smooth and silky baritone" voice, Thomas enjoyed a career spanning more than 70 years, and was best known as the narrator of the television series Forensic Files.

== Early life ==
Thomas was born and raised in Pensacola, Florida. His father, John D. Thomas, was a Welsh-born World War I veteran and pastor of Pensacola's First Presbyterian Church. His mother, Sybil A. Thomas, was a schoolteacher originally from Newcastle upon Tyne, England.

In 1943, Thomas turned down a draft deferment and volunteered for the United States Army, serving with the First Infantry Division in five major campaigns of World War II, including the Battle of Normandy and the Battle of the Bulge. He was a recipient of the Bronze Star, the Purple Heart, the French Croix de Guerre, and Belgian Fourragère.

== Career ==
At the age of 14, Thomas told his father of his desire to break into radio, and the elder Thomas persuaded the manager of Pensacola's only radio station to hire Peter, who eventually earned $4 a week (equivalent to $91 in 2025) as an announcer. After his World War II army service, Thomas worked briefly as a television announcer in Mobile, Alabama, before moving to Memphis, Tennessee in 1946. While attending college in Memphis, Thomas starred as "Uncle Pete" on the WMCT television comedy The Unhandy Handyman until 1951. During that period, he also narrated the radio program Dream Time.

In 1951, Thomas took a television job with WCBS in New York, working primarily on newscasts, but also lent his voice in announcing the radio soap opera Young Doctor Malone from the late 1950s to 1960. In 1962, desiring to work on documentaries and commercials, Thomas left CBS to work as a freelancer.

Thomas was best known for narrating all 400 non-special episodes of the series Forensic Files from 1996 to 2011. He would spend as many as six hours reviewing and rehearsing each Forensic Files script with his wife Stella, and also rewrote portions of some scripts, which was encouraged by creator/producer Paul Dowling.

Thomas also voiced thirteen episodes of the science documentary series Nova and the underwriting credits of Nature, both for PBS, and the documentary How the West Was Lost for the Discovery Channel. Thomas worked extensively in commercials, voicing advertisements for American Express, IBM, Listerine, Siemens, and Cool Whip among countless others. Paul Hardcastle's 1985 song "19" made use of extensive samples of Thomas's voice, taken from the 1982 documentary Vietnam Requiem. The song topped the charts in twelve countries, and Thomas was paid royalties for the use of his voice.

Thomas was especially proud of his narration of the Academy Award-winning HBO documentary One Survivor Remembers, chronicling the experience of Gerda Weissmann Klein, who was interned at the Nordhausen concentration camp.

In 2002, Thomas's mastery of his craft was praised by the Naples Daily News, saying, "Narrator Peter Thomas has a voice that spans generations. It's a measured, reassuring, emphatic voice, that enunciates each word clearly and pauses in the all the right places for dramatic effect—a confident, practiced voice."

== Personal life and death ==
Thomas married his high school sweetheart, Stella Barrineau, on June 29, 1946; she died on June 16, 2014. The couple raised three children (Peter Jr., Douglas, and Elizabeth) in Greenwich, Connecticut, and in 1985, they settled in Naples, Florida. He was heavily involved in work with veterans, having served on the board of the National D-Day Memorial Foundation and in other similar roles. Having been involved in liberating Nordhausen, Thomas also was a strong supporter of the U.S. Holocaust Memorial Museum; he narrated the museum's original audio tour and documentary.

Thomas died on April 30, 2016, at the age of 91. He was memorialized at the end of the first episode of Forensic Files II which aired on February 23, 2020.
