= Forensic Files season 10 =

Forensic Files
- Season 10
- No. of episodes: 42

Release
- Original network: Court TV
- Original release: April 27, 2005 – March 15, 2006

Season chronology
- ← Previous; Season 9 Next → Season 11

Forensic Files is an American documentary-style series which reveals how forensic science is used to solve violent crimes, mysterious accidents, and even outbreaks of illness. The series was broadcast on Court TV, narrated by Peter Thomas, and produced by Medstar Television, in association with Court TV Original Productions. It has broadcast 406 episodes since its debut on TLC in 1996 as Medical Detectives.

== Episodes ==
No. overall	No. in season	Title	Original release date
216	1	"Trial By Fire"	April 27, 2005
A house erupted in flames near Jackson, Georgia in January 2003, killing 53-year-old tree trimmer Jim Long and injuring his wife Jean. She blamed a kerosene heater; the evidence at the scene did not support her story, and she was charged with arson and murder. It would take a nationally known fire investigator to determine what happened and who was responsible. The reconstruction revealed that Jim had accidentally used gasoline in the kerosene heater, which set his clothes on fire and caused him to fall and knock himself out while flailing around. This explained why the position of his body did not correspond with Jean’s account of events. Jean Long was acquitted by the jury, but was forced to change her name and move away because several people protested the decision.
217	2	"Marked For Life"	May 18, 2005
It was 1957, and California police were searching for a man who had committed several crimes in one night – including murdering two police officers. They followed thousands of leads but, eventually, the case turned cold. Almost 50 years later, with the help of advances in computer technology and handwriting analysis, investigators proved an old adage: You can run, but you can't hide, as former drifter-turned loving grandfather Gerald Mason found out the hard way. He had been pulled over by the two policemen for a traffic violation while trying to escape after carjacking two teenage couples and raping one of the girls, and out of fear of being exposed if the registration was checked, he killed the cops and escaped. After breaking down in tears out of remorse for his past sins, Mason was sentenced to two life terms for killing the policemen, as statutes had expired on his other crimes.
218	3	"Plastic Puzzle"	June 1, 2005
In 1995, a man riding a bicycle was fatally injured, and police believed he was the victim of a hit-and-run accident. Tiny clues found at the scene created a picture of the vehicle which struck him and led police to its driver.
219	4	"Up In Smoke"	June 29, 2005
In 1996, when 81-year-old Ed Camiolo and his 57-year-old wife Rosalie died in a suspicious house fire, their 30-year-old son Paul became the prime suspect. The son insisted he was innocent; he said he tried to extinguish the fire by pouring water on it, but that only made it worse. Investigators turned to forensic science to determine if the fire had been set deliberately or if it was an unfortunate accident. Tests eventually showed that the cheap varnish on the Camiolos’ floor was to blame, and Paul Camiolo was acquitted of any wrongdoing.
220	5	"Soiled Plan"	July 6, 2005
On November 2, 1978, police in Mansfield, Ohio instituted an intense search when the mother of two young children went missing and, less than a day later, they found her body. The evidence was little better than circumstantial, and the crime drifted to the bottom of the cold case files. Twenty years later, advances in technology enabled investigators to see the evidence in a new light and discover it pointed directly to the killer.
221	6	"Headquarters"	July 13, 2005
In 1993, when hunters reported finding a skull in a Texas canyon, police immediately began an investigation. At the scene, they found bits of clothing, a woman's shoe, some small bones and a strand of hair. An anthropologist determined the victim was a Caucasian woman, and that she had been stabbed repeatedly. A forensic artist reconstructed her face, and the image was released to media. Eventually, police learned who she was. Now all they had to do was find her killer.
222	7	"One For The Road"	July 20, 2005
In 2003, 62-year-old real estate mogul Mike Garvin and his 55-year-old wife Shirley decided to escape the cold of winter with a mini-vacation in Key West. On the first day, Shirley went missing, and police searched every square inch of the island; they found nothing but a pair of sandals which might have belonged to her. Then two important pieces of video surfaced, both of which seemed to show Mike had traveled to Key West alone, and investigators began to wonder if they should be searching for a missing person or a killer. Eventually, thanks to a GPS tracker, police discovered Shirley’s body in a shallow grave near the couple’s home. Mike had substantial debts and was also a womanizer; he killed Shirley when she planned to leave him, buried her body, then drove to Key West by himself to make it look like Shirley disappeared from there. Mike Garvin ultimately pleaded guilty to second-degree murder and was sentenced to life in prison. He died 17 years later.
223	8	"Army Of Evidence"	July 27, 2005
In 1991, a mother of two Dorothy Davis was found dead in her bedroom. It appeared she had killed herself: There were suicide notes near her body, and a pistol was in her hand. Her death was ruled a suicide – but when investigators learned she had almost died in a house fire three years earlier, they decided to take another look at the evidence.
224	9	"Shear Luck"	August 3, 2005
In 1991, when 33-year-old Julie Snodgrass was brutally murdered in the Philippines, the Air Force Office of Special Investigators swung into action. Clues led to the victim's husband, Joe, but he insisted he was innocent. To find out if he was telling the truth, investigators would have to do something unprecedented: Reassemble a 5-1/4 inch computer disk which had been cut to pieces with pinking shears. Despite all odds, they succeeded, and analysis of the disk proved that Joe had orchestrated Julie’s murder but had not actually committed the crime himself. Nevertheless, Joe Snodgrass was sentenced to life in prison as the mastermind.
225	10	"Tagging A Suspect"	August 10, 2005
Bombings are difficult to solve, because the perpetrator is not usually at the scene, and the evidence goes up in smoke. But there are clues if investigators know where to look. In this 1979 case, 45-year-old steel worker Nathan Allen was killed by a bomb in his pickup truck, and pieces of plastic the size of grains of sand held the key to his murder, leading police straight to Nathan’s uncle, Pete McFillin. Nathan and his aunt-by-marriage, Sue McFillin, had been high school friends, but Pete suspected it was something more, and ultimately killed Nathan out of jealousy. Pete McFillin was sentenced to life in prison.
226	11	"Strong Impressions"	August 17, 2005
In 1984, the wife of an Air Force officer was found dead in her bed, with a plastic laundry bag near her face. At first glance, it appeared she had been doing laundry, fell asleep, rolled onto the bag, and suffocated. But further investigation proved that the scene had been staged. Her death was not an accident; it was cold-blooded murder.
227	12	"Cereal Killer"	August 24, 2005
When a fire destroyed most of Bob Wood's Newman Lake, Washington home and his 11-year-old son Christopher went missing on February 9, 1999, police organized the largest search in the history of their small town. First the boy's backpack was discovered five miles from home, and then his body was found 50 miles away. But the killer had been careless, and the evidence he left behind would lead police directly to him. Bob had in fact killed Christopher for his life insurance to pay off debts, and ultimately committed suicide while awaiting trial.
228	13	"Crash Course"	August 31, 2005
On March 22, 2002, 41-year-old Debra Hollermann was killed after her husband Steve crashed into an abandoned car on the side of the highway. The highway patrolman dispatched to what he thought would be a routine traffic accident was shocked by the large amount of blood -- and by the coroner's ruling of accidental death. He eventually proved Steve killed Debra by slamming her head against the car window and staged the crash to cover it up. Steve Hollermann was convicted of second-degree murder and sentenced to 30 years in prison.
229	14	"A Leg Up On Crime"	September 7, 2005
In 1986, the decomposed body of a young woman was discovered in a Bakersfield, California irrigation canal. If there was trace evidence, it had been washed away. Another victim was found in that same canal a year later; this time, the perpetrator had been careless. The shoe prints found at the scene would lead police to the most unlikely of killers.
230	15	"Tight-fitting Genes"	September 14, 2005
In 2002, a behavioral profile caused the Baton Rouge Police Department to search for the wrong man. They might not have made an arrest had it not been for a DNA picture of the suspect Derrick Todd Lee, painted by a molecular biologist.
231	16	"Deadly Valentine"	September 21, 2005
In 2001, an obstetrician returned home from the hospital and found his wife on the floor of the bathroom. She was covered with blood and not breathing. He tried unsuccessfully to revive her, staining his clothes with her blood in the process, and then he called 911. His version of events was not supported by the blood spatter evidence, and investigators had to determine why.
232	17	"Picture This"	September 28, 2005
In 1995, a Modesto, California teenager Genna Gamble went missing. There was no sign of a struggle in her home and police suspected she had simply run away until her naked, bruised body was discovered in a ditch 20 miles away. Evidence soon led police to the girl's stepfather, with evidence suggesting that he killed her during a fight and hid her body for fear of losing his job as a result.
233	18	"Oily In The Morning"	October 5, 2005
On February 7, 1997, when authorities in Yolo County, California recovered the submerged car of Nick Howard, an 18-year-old reported missing, they expected to find his body – but it was not there. His broken eyeglasses were on the floor of the vehicle and the interior was coated with motor oil. 3 weeks later, his body was found just a 1/4 of a mile downstream from the crash site. Police eventually proved Nick and his mother’s ex-boyfriend Ralph Marcus conspired to fake Nick’s death, only for Marcus to kill Nick for real. The con quickly fell apart, and Marcus was sentenced to life.
234	19	"Gold Rush"	October 12, 2005
In 1998, emergency dispatch received a call from a man who said his girlfriend shot and killed herself. Police found the victim in the caller's house, lying in a pool of blood with the gun next to her on the floor. The autopsy revealed that the gunshot wound was not self-inflicted and the evidence found on her body would give police a golden opportunity to catch her killer.
235	20	"Four On The Floor"	October 19, 2005
In 2000, Betty Lee, a 36-year-old Native American woman, was brutally killed in the desert of New Mexico, and the crime scene was rich in forensic evidence: tire tracks, shoe impressions and even the murder weapons. The site was less than 10 miles from another crime scene where, two years earlier, a male Native American was beaten and stabbed to death. Police began to wonder: was a serial killer on the loose? Apparently so, and the evidence soon exposed that person as 26-year-old Robert Fry, who was sentenced to death for Betty’s murder and life in prison for each of the other killings.
236	21	"Writer's Block"	October 26, 2005
In 1991, a brilliant young architect became ill and died just before she was to testify in a criminal trial. The autopsy revealed she'd been poisoned with arsenic; it was a slow and painful death, so suicide was unlikely. Investigators had to determine who among her family, friends and business associates had a motive for murder.
237	22	"A Clean Getaway"	November 2, 2005
On January 18, 1992, Kathy Woodhouse, a 40-year-old employee of a drycleaner in Herrin, Illinois, was raped and murdered in the store, and investigators thought themselves fortunate to have two eyewitnesses. Their descriptions were similar but not identical, and the prime suspect did not come close to resembling that person. Police turned to forensic science for the answers they needed, and soon discovered that the phone call reporting the murder had been made by the killer, who was revealed to be 21-year-old Paul Taylor. Taylor was convicted of Kathy’s murder and originally sentenced to death, but this was later commuted to life without parole.
238	23	"Prints Among Thieves"	November 9, 2005
In 1996, the murder of 80-year-old eccentric millionaire Robert Rogers was not entirely unexpected; he flaunted his wealth and cared little for personal security. The prime suspect was Robert's son Donald, whom he had recently disinherited, but a shoe print led to his caretaker, 31-year-old Sharon Zachary. Sharon had killed Robert because he found out she was misappropriating his money, and she was sentenced to life in prison.
239	24	"Unholy Alliance"	November 16, 2005
In 1999, when Natalie Mirabal disappeared, police from Longmont, Colorado feared she was the latest victim in a string of similar crimes. But the MO was not quite right. A pair of bloody gloves, unique tire tracks, and ordinary grass and pine needles provided investigators with some extraordinary clues.
240	25	"Signed, Sealed & Delivered"	November 23, 2005
19-year-old George Kerr was granted immunity for testifying against R.D. Cheeley and Doug Gustavson, who shot and killed a vehicle’s passenger in a road rage incident, and sent them to prison for life. Shortly afterwards a bomb exploded in Kerr's family home, instantly killing his father, 44-year-old David, and maiming his stepmother Michelle. Investigators turned to forensic science, hoping to determine if this was an act of revenge and if there was a way to link the two deadly crimes. Eventually, it was proved that Cheeley and Gustavson had orchestrated the bombing from prison, and they were again sentenced to life.
241	26	"Cop Out"	November 30, 2005
In 2004, 23-year-old homosexual college student Jesse Valencia was found dead, and the evidence suggested he knew his killer. Three hairs and some microscopic cells helped police to unravel a web of lies and find the motive for murder. However, they were shocked to discover the truth; 28-year-old police officer Stephen Rios had been having an affair with Jesse and killed him when Jesse threatened to expose the relationship. Rios was sentenced to life without parole.
242	27	"Summer Obsession"	December 7, 2005
In 1997, in an affluent suburb of Philadelphia, police were called to the home of Craig and Stefanie Rabinowitz, where Stefanie appeared to have accidentally drowned in the bathtub. The investigation gradually focused on Craig. Craig had actually been embezzling money from his job and spending it on exotic dancers, and when he could not pay the money back, he murdered Stefanie for her life insurance. Craig Rabinowitz was sentenced to life in prison for his wife's murder.
243	28	"Elemental Clue"	December 14, 2005
In 1997, when two women from Kirkland, Washington were murdered in the same way, police feared a serial killer was on the loose. At first they thought the victims had nothing in common until they found tiny clues linking them to the same man.
244	29	"Moss, Not Grass"	December 21, 2005
In 1999, a young woman was found dead on a golf course in The Bahamas. The grass on that course was so distinctive, it had evidentiary value. The evidence led police to two suspects. Each blamed the other, and they had to find out who the killer was.
245	30	"Material Witness"	December 28, 2005
In 1986, a teenager went missing after an evening of horseback riding. Her body was found a month later, three miles from her home. The killer unknowingly left trace evidence behind – tiny but unmistakable clues which pointed to him and him alone.
246	31	"Garden of Evil"	January 4, 2006
When popular Hampton, Virginia disc jockey Debbie Dicus was found murdered in a community garden on May 9, 1987, police swung into action. A sniffer dog and a blood spatter expert led police to the killer and he had been much closer than they realized.
247	32	"Sunday School Ambush"	January 11, 2006
When Rob Andrew was gunned down in his own garage by intruders in November 2001, Oklahoma City investigators worked tirelessly to find the assassins. But when they discovered that a wound sustained during the attack by the grieving widow may have been self-inflicted, they turned to science to help them unravel a twisted tale of lust, greed and deception. Brenda Andrew had ordered a hit on her husband, and was ultimately sentenced to death.
248	33	"Penchant for Poison"	January 18, 2006
In 1988, the seemingly unrelated deaths of three elderly people (Olgie Nobles and sisters Catherine and Cordelia Norton) in San Angelo, Texas proved to be serial murders. The killer, Timothy Scoggin, had been careful – he used arsenic, a poison which had no taste or odor. Fortunately for investigators, it also had a unique chemical signature.
249	34	"Bump in the Night"	January 25, 2006
In 1990, within Cape Girardeau, Missouri, the victim had been brutally murdered as he slept in his own bed. The crime scene was awash with blood. There were no foreign fingerprints in his home, but investigators did find a shoe impression in the mud outside physical evidence they hoped would lead them to the killer.
250	35	"Sole Searching"	February 1, 2006
Now it is not only a fingerprint which can link a killer to a crime; a shoe print can be just as telling. Armed with little else, police hoped the shoe impressions found at a 1993, Lansing, Michigan crime scene would put their investigation of Audrey Nichols' murder back on track.
251	36	"Murder on the Menu"	February 8, 2006
Two days after Christmas in 1996, the head chef of a historic Philadelphia restaurant was found dead. Investigators interviewed the usual suspects: family, friends, and coworkers. As they sifted through the evidence, police uncovered a chilling tale of debt and deceit.
252	37	"Hot on the Trail"	February 15, 2006
A serial arsonist was on the loose in Washington, D.C. Each of the fires was started with the same type of incendiary device. Thomas Sweatt was very careful and seemed to leave no evidence behind but there were clues in the ashes and it was up to forensic scientists to find them.
253	38	"High 'n Dry"	February 22, 2006
When Genell Plude was found dead in her bathroom in 1999, the scene pointed to suicide. But a coroner's inquest and a unique application of forensic science gave investigators a different explanation for her death. It was a theory which, if true, could turn her husband Doug into the prime suspect.
254	39	"To the Viktor"	March 1, 2006
After Victor Gunnarsson, once a suspect in the assassination of Swedish Prime Minister Olof Palme, is found murdered in North Carolina, investigators on both sides of the Atlantic needed to find out if they were related and, if they were, who or what they had in common. In the end, however, it was revealed that Gunnarsson’s girlfriend Kay Wedon, not Palme, was the person at the center of the case; Wedon’s ex-fiancé, police officer Lamont Underwood, had killed Gunnarsson out of jealousy, as Underwood was extremely possessive of Wedon. It was later revealed that Underwood had also murdered Wedon’s mother, and he was ultimately imprisoned for life.
255	40	"Wired for Disaster"	March 8, 2006
On May 22, 1993, 29-year-old Kem Wenger was killed instantly when a bomb exploded in her Bloomington, Illinois home. The device was so powerful that shrapnel was embedded in houses across the street. The bomber had not only knowledge and skill, but also a motive for murder.
256	41	"Wood-be Killer"	March 15, 2006
In Farmersville, Texas, in March 2004, the killer of Rachelle Tolleson tried to incinerate and destroy everything that could link him to his crime. But in doing so, he inadvertently created new forensic evidence, evidence which came to light with a technique never before used in a criminal investigation.
257	42	"Enemy Within"	December 7, 2005
Kansas City, Missouri, attorney Richard Armitage was brutally murdered in his office in broad daylight in May 2000. The first prime suspect was Lou Campbell, who had previously threatened Armitage, but he was later cleared. Police turn their suspicions to Armitage's law partner Richard Buchli, who had very little success as a lawyer and was in debt for more than $250,000. This episode has been deleted due to circumstances surrounding this case
