= Quest Global =

Engineering services company

- Type: Private
- Industry: Engineering services
- Founded: 1997
- Founders: Ajit Prabhu; Aravind Melligeri
- Headquarters: Singapore
- Area served: Worldwide
- Key people: Ajit Prabhu (co-founder and chief executive officer); Aravind Melligeri (co-founder and board member)
- Revenue: ▲US$1.1 billion (FY2025)
- Number of employees: 23,000+ (2025)
- Subsidiaries: Quest Defense Systems & Solutions
- Website: www.questglobal.com

Quest Global (formerly QuEST Global) is an engineering services company with its headquarters in Singapore. Founded in 1997 by Ajit Prabhu and Aravind Melligeri, it serves clients in industries such as aerospace, automotive, and energy. As of 2025, it employed more than 23,000 people across more than 104 locations in 17 countries.

== History ==
Ajit Prabhu and Aravind Melligeri, both engineers from Karnataka, India, founded the company in 1997 in Schenectady, New York. Prabhu had worked as a contract engineer at General Electric's research centre in Schenectady, and Melligeri had worked at Ford Motor Company.

During the 2000s, the company established its main engineering centre in Bengaluru and later opened offices in Japan, the United States, and Europe. By 2016, it employed approximately 7,800 people, most of them in India.

The company made several acquisitions between 2018 and 2022. In 2018, it acquired DETECH Fahrzeugentwicklung, a German automotive engineering firm, along with IT Six Global, Mobiliya Technologies, and EXILANT Technologies. In 2021, it acquired Synapse Design, a semiconductor design company based in Silicon Valley. In 2022, it acquired EXB Solutions, a Minneapolis-based engineering company, through its United States subsidiary, Quest Defense Systems & Solutions.

== Operations ==
The company's largest operations are in Bengaluru, and it maintains offices in Hyderabad, Pune, Chennai, and Kochi. It also has operations in the United States, the United Kingdom, Germany, France, and Japan. Its services include mechanical, digital, and software engineering. The subsidiary Quest Defense Systems & Solutions works on government and military contracts. Since 2023, Quest Global has provided engineering services to Babcock International in the United Kingdom's naval nuclear sector, including naval architecture, electrical power distribution, and decommissioning work.

== Ownership and finance ==
Carlyle Group invested $6 million in the company in 2003 and sold its stake back to the company in 2007. Warburg Pincus held approximately 25 percent of the company from 2010 to 2016. In 2016, Bain Capital, Singapore's GIC, and Advent International acquired minority stakes at a valuation of approximately $1 billion.

In 2021, ChrysCapital and True North purchased shares from the founders in a secondary transaction valued at $150 million, giving the company an implied valuation of approximately $1.8 billion. Carlyle returned as an investor in 2023, through Carlyle Asia Partners, paying approximately $2 billion for a stake of about 24 percent. Prabhu subsequently increased his stake to approximately 42 percent. In February 2026, Hillhouse Investment Management acquired an approximately 5 percent stake at a reported valuation of around $4.5 billion.

In February 2026, Prabhu announced plans for an initial public offering on Indian stock exchanges.
