= Omega Engineering =

American control sensors company, founded 1962

OMEGA Engineering, Inc.
- Industry: Instrumentation
- Founded: Stamford, Connecticut in 1962
- Founder: Betty Hollander
- Headquarters: Norwalk, Connecticut, United States
- Key people: Naoto Mizuta, CEO
- Products: thermocouples flow meters pH meters electric heaters data collection automation devices
- Revenue: $168 million (2010)
- Number of employees: 700
- Parent: Arcline Investment Management
- Website: omega.com

Omega Engineering (stylized OMEGA) is an American instrumentation company headquartered in Norwalk, Connecticut, with its main factory in Swedesboro, New Jersey.

It has sales offices in the United Kingdom, Canada, Germany, China, Brazil, Singapore, Korea, Japan, and Mexico. Local websites are also available for customers in France, Spain, Italy, Denmark, Netherlands, Australia, India, and Chile. Omega does business with the United States Navy, NASA, and industrial corporations.

== History ==
The company was founded in 1962 by Betty Hollander at her kitchen table while she was raising four children. Omega began as a thermocouple manufacturer but slowly transitioned to other types of instrumentation. As of 2014, Omega manufactures and sells devices that measure everything from temperature to pH. In 2016, as the company moved their headquarters to Norwalk, Connecticut, President Joe Vorih publicly stated that Omega would be "moving from being a traditional industrial sensor company to a wireless technology company."

=== Hacking ===
In 1996, Tim Lloyd, an 11-year employee of Omega and a network administrator within the company, was fired. Three weeks after he was fired, he unleashed a software time bomb within Omega's computer systems, deleting the software that ran all of the company's manufacturing operations at its factory in Bridgeport, New Jersey. Law enforcement was contacted by Omega executives during the second week of the incident and the U.S. Secret Service found suspicious activity early on, including deliberate data erasure and reformatting of critical files. The company spent nearly $2 million repairing the programs and lost nearly $10 million (equivalent to $37 million in 2024) in revenue, resulting in 80 employee layoffs, though Lloyd's lawyer stated that Omega's losses were far smaller. Lloyd was convicted of computer sabotage and sentenced to 41 months in Federal prison. The Lloyd hacking case is considered one of the largest employee sabotage cases in United States business history. The case also aired in a Forensic Files episode "Hack Attack", episode 39 of season 8.

== Sale to Spectris ==
In April 2011, Betty Hollander died, and the company was turned over to her husband Milton. Later that year, he sold Omega Engineering – which had recorded revenue of $168 million (equivalent to $235 million in 2024) the prior year – to British-based Spectris for $475 million (equivalent to $652 million in 2024). Then in March 2017, Spectris was forced to recognize an impairment charge of £115 million (equivalent to £147 million in 2024) with relation to the past acquisition. This charge decreased goodwill and other intangible assets on Spectris' balance sheet. The charge also decreased its 2016 net income.

== Sale to Arcline ==
On 19 April 2022, Spectris announced the sale of Omega Engineering to US-based Arcline Investment Management for $525 million (equivalent to $558 million in 2024). This was more than $100 million above the net book value subsequent to the goodwill write-off that Spectris previously took. Omega was merged into Arcline's Dwyer Group, renamed the DwyerOmega Group.
