= Victor Gunnarsson =

Swedish murder victim and suspect

Åke Lennart Viktor Gunnarsson (31 March 1953 – 3 or 4 December 1993) was a Swedish right-wing political activist, who was a suspect in the 1986 assassination of Prime Minister Olof Palme. He emigrated to the United States, and was later murdered in 1993 in North Carolina by former police officer Lamont C. Underwood as part of a love triangle.

== Assassination of Olof Palme ==
Gunnarsson (labeled in the media 33-åringen, "the 33-year-old") was an early suspect in the assassination of Olof Palme on the late evening of 28 February 1986, in Stockholm, Sweden. He was taken in for questioning a first time on 8 March, but released the same evening, but taken in again on 12 March. On 17 March, he was taken into custody and the prosecutor made a request to the court to have Gunnarsson detained. After evidence against him had weakened, primarily due to less weight being placed on identification near the scene by one eyewitness, he was released on 11 April. However, Gunnarsson continued to be the subject of continued telephone surveillance for some period of time.

Gunnarsson had connections to various right wing political groups. He was a member of the European Workers Party, the Swedish branch of the LaRouche movement, for a year before being kicked out in 1985. Also, EWP pamphlets, featuring much anti-Palme content, were found in his home outside Stockholm.

Gunnarsson suffered protracted harassment on account of his status as a suspect in Palme's murder. In time, he emigrated to the United States.

== Death ==
Gunnarsson's nearly naked body was found in a wooded area called Deep Gap about 86 miles from his apartment in Salisbury, North Carolina. He had been shot twice in the head with a .22 caliber firearm. The date of death was placed at 3 or 4 December 1993.

Investigation came to focus on former policeman Lamont C. Underwood, the obsessive ex-fiancé of Kay Weden. Gunnarsson and Weden had been dating for a few months at the time of his death. Underwood was convicted of Gunnarsson's murder in 1997 and sentenced to life imprisonment plus 40 years. Underwood was additionally convicted of murdering Catherine Miller, Kay Weden's mother; the motive for both murders was argued to have been Underwood's desire to cause suffering to Weden in retaliation for her breaking up with him.

In January 2010, a judge sitting in the U.S. District Court for the Western District of North Carolina ruled that Underwood had suffered from ineffective counsel and ordered that he be granted a new trial or be released from prison in 180 days. That decision was overturned and the new trial denied by the U.S. Court of Appeals for the Fourth Circuit in January 2011. The appeals court ruled that even if Underwood's lawyers had been ineffective as he claimed, the evidence against him was so overwhelming that his counsels' alleged lack of competence would have been immaterial. Underwood was incarcerated in Marion Correctional Institution in North Carolina until his death on 23 December 2018.

== In the media ==
Gunnarsson's murder was featured on the Court TV series Forensic Files (S10E39, "To the Viktor"), the Discovery Channel series The New Detectives (S6E5). Also Dead of Winter "Cold Blue" (Season 2 Episode 2), and Oxygen True Crime series Buried in the Backyard "The Swedish Connection" (Season 6, Episode 1).
