= Spectris =

British instrumentation and measurement specialist

Spectris plc
- Type: Private
- Traded as: LSE: SXS
- Industry: Instrumentation
- Founded: 1915; 111 years ago
- Headquarters: London, United Kingdom
- Key people: Andrew Williams, Chairman; Constance Baroudel, CEO-elect
- Owner: KKR & Co.
- Number of employees: 7,600 (2025)
- Website: spectris.com

Spectris plc is a supplier of precision instrumentation and controls. It was listed on the London Stock Exchange until it was acquired by KKR in December 2025.

== History ==
The company was founded by Richard Fairey in 1915, as the Fairey Aviation Company with the objective of manufacturing seaplanes. In 1980 the business was acquired by Pearson from which it was the subject of a management buy-out in 1987. It was first listed on the London Stock Exchange in 1988. In the 1990s the company focused on electronics selling its electrical insulator and hydraulic actuator businesses.

In 1997 it acquired Burnfield, a measuring instruments manufacturer, and in 1999 it bought Servomex, an industrial instruments manufacturer. In 2000 it bought four instrumentation businesses from Spectris A.G. of Germany and then in 2001 changed its name to Spectris plc. In 2002 it bought the Philips Analytical business. In 2011, Spectris bought Omega Engineering for $475 million.

In December 2012 it sold Fusion UV to Heraeus Holding, GmbH. for US$172 million in cash, using the proceeds to pay down debt. In 2014 it acquired ESG Solutions, an industry leader and pioneer in microseismic technology and services for the oil and gas, mining and geotechnical industries.

In January 2018, Spectris Group acquired Concept Life Sciences from the private equity firm Equistone Partners for £163m. In April 2018, Spectris acquired Revolutionary Engineering from company management for US$19m on a debt and cash-free basis and merged the company into the Spectris owned subsidiary, Millbrook Proving Ground. In July 2018, Spectris acquired the leading provider of turnkey solutions, VI-Grade for an undisclosed sum. It joined Spectris as an independent company; however, following changes in the business merged with Spectris owned HBK in February 2020.

In July 2018, Andrew Heath was announced as the new CEO of Spectris following the retirement of John O’Higgins. O'Higgins was CEO of Spectris for 12 years. Heath formally joined Spectris as the CEO in September 2018.

In September 2019 it announced the divestment of BTG to Voith for total gross cash consideration of €319 million (£283 million).

In January 2020, Spectris announcement the divestment of EMS Brüel & Kjær, a joint venture with Macquarie Corporate Holdings Pty Limited. Spectris and Macquarie Corporate Holdings Pty Limited divested EMS Brüel & Kjær to Envirosuite Limited, an environmental management technology company. Spectris received AUD35 million cash, less repayment of EMS B&K's debt facility on completion, and 10 million shares in Envirosuit in consideration.

In November 2020, it was announced that HBK subsidiary, VI-grade would acquire Imtec Engineering for an undisclosed sum. Further to acquisition of IMTEC Engineering, the traffic simulation and sensor simulation company, RightHook, was acquired and merged into VI-grade in November 2020 for an undisclosed sum.

Spectris announced in December 2020 that Millbrook Proving Ground would be divested from the Spectris portfolio of companies and acquired by UTAC CERAM for £133 million. The divestment was completed on the 2 February 2021.

In December 2020 it was announced that B&K Vibro, another Spectris company, would be acquired by NSK Group for £163 million in cash.

In April 2021, Spectris announced the acquisition of the real-time operating system developer and manufacturer Concurrent Real-Time from Battery Ventures, a Boston-based PE firm, for a purchase consideration of $166.7 million (£121.2 million) in cash. Spectris also announced the divestment of ESG Solutions from its Industrial Solutions Division for $4 million to SCF Partners to be merged into their existing company Deep Imaging Technologies, Inc. Following this, on the 24 August 2021, the divestment of NDC Technologies was confirmed. NDC was acquired by Nordson Corporation from Spectris for $180 million.

Spectris announced on 11 January 2022 that the specialist bioanalysis sensor company, Creoptix, had been acquired by Malvern Panalytical for an undisclosed sum. Creoptix would be integrated into Malvern Panalytical throughout the first half of 2022. In April the Spectris operating company, Red Lion Controls, announced that they have acquired MB Connect Line for an undisclosed figure.

On the 19 April 2022, Spectris announced its intention to divest Omega Engineering to the Dwyer Group, an Arcline portfolio company, for $525 million subject to regulatory approval. In addition, Spectris announced a share buyback programme of up to £300 million, with an initial tranche of £150 million followed by a further £150 million subject to approval by shareholders.

In May 2022, it was announced Spectris had acquired the California-based designer and manufacturer of piezo-electric accelerometers and dynamic force sensors, Dytran Instruments for £66 million.

In June 2025, Spectris stated that it would agree to be taken private by Advent International if the private equity firm made its £3.73 billion ($5.06 billion) offer official. In July 2025, Spectris agreed to a takeover offer from U.S. investment firm KKR valuing it at 4.7 billion pounds ($6.46 billion) including debt, and withdrew its support for a rival offer from Advent. The transaction was approved by the court on 2 December 2025, so allowing it to proceed to completion.

In May 2026, Andrew Williams, Chairman and interim CEO, announced that Constance Baroudel would be appointed CEO later in the year.

== Operations ==
The company is organised as follows:

- Platforms
  - Malvern Panalytical
  - HBK
- Industrial Solutions Division
  - Particle Measuring Systems
  - Red Lion Controls
  - Servomex
