= Forensic Files season 8 =

Forensic Files
- Season 8
- No. of episodes: 42

Release
- Original network: Court TV
- Original release: April 1, 2003 – December 26, 2005

Season chronology
- ← Previous; Season 7 Next → Season 9

Forensic Files is an American documentary-style series which reveals how forensic science is used to solve violent crimes, mysterious accidents, and even outbreaks of illness. The series was broadcast on Court TV, narrated by Peter Thomas, and produced by Medstar Television, in association with Court TV Original Productions. It has broadcast 406 episodes since its debut on TLC in 1996 as Medical Detectives.

== Episodes ==
No. overall	No. in season	Title	Original release date
144	1	"Dessert Served Cold"	April 1, 2003
In 1990, 61-year-old Richard Alfredo died in his home after a long history of heart disease. It was assumed that this was the cause of his death. A few weeks after the funeral, rumors surfaced that his girlfriend, 39-year-old Christina Martin, had poisoned him. When the body was exhumed, scientists needed to know: could the dead tell tales?
145	2	"The Music Case"	February 10, 2004
On April 20, 1999, 12-year-old Cally Jo Larson was found murdered in her own home and it changed the feeling of security residents had in the small town of Waseca, Minnesota. Despite a meticulous search of the Larson home and an exhaustive investigation, police had no suspects. Then a string of burglaries several months after the murder led police to the home of Lorenzo Bahena Sanchez, where they found a cache of stolen goods, which included CD cases similar to those belonging to Cally Jo. That evidence would make the case, and bring the killer to justice.
146	3	"Paintball"	April 30, 2004
In 1962, the people of the small town of Hanford, California lost their sense of peace when one of their own, 15-year-old Marlene Miller, was murdered. Booker T. Hillery was convicted but after an appeal to the Supreme Court, Hillery received a re-trial in 1983. Forensic scientists had to use new knowledge of microscopic evidence to be able to place Hillery at the scene.
147	4	"Sign Here"	April 23, 2003
On May 6, 1996, 30-year-old Sherri Dally, a mother of two, vanishes after a shopping trip. A month later, Sherri was found stabbed to death in a field near the parking lot. Witnesses say they saw the victim being forced into a car by an unknown woman. Police later learned that car had been rented, but the signature on the rental agreement did not match that of their prime suspect, Sherri's husband Michael. A forensic handwriting expert showed investigators the signs, which clearly pointed to the murderer – Michael's mistress, Diana Hahn. She had abducted Sherri by disguising herself as a plainclothes cop and pretending to arrest her, then killed her in the backseat of the car, disposed of the body, and tried to wash the evidence out of the car. Diana and Michael were both charged with Sherri's murder and sentenced to life in prison.
148	5	"Shadow of a Doubt"	April 29, 2003
On October 20, 1997, Jennifer Myers is shot to death in her Spring Grove, Pennsylvania store just one day before she is to testify against the man accused of robbing her a year earlier, 40-year-old Kevin Dowling. The robber becomes the prime suspect, but he has a solid alibi: a time-stamped videotape of his outdoor activities on the day of the murder. Police asked a local physics professor to help them authenticate the videotape which enabled them to prove Dowling had messed with the time on his camera to fake his alibi, while he killed Jennifer to avoid being convicted of robbery. However, investigators saw through this cover, and as a result, Dowling was also convicted of murder and received the death penalty. The extent of the hatred and scorn towards Dowling from his family for what he did can be shown by a visit to his former home, where the notice granting a divorce to his former wife Joanne has been framed and now hangs in the living room.
149	6	"Tourist Trap"	June 4, 2003
In 1993, the state of Florida was known for more than just swimsuits, sun, and Disney World. Worldwide attention focused on a rash of robberies, which targeted tourists. Some vacationers were killed in these attacks, but some fought and survived, despite severe injuries. Helga Luest, a journalist vacationing from the Washington, DC area, survived her attack and became an impassioned advocate and founder of the national nonprofit Witness Justice. A severe bite that she sustained would be the key piece of evidence used to convict a determinedly uncooperative suspect, Stanley Cornet, who ran into an even more determined detective. The forensic evidence was unshakable, and Cornet was ultimately sentenced to life under a three-strikes law. Cornet's accomplice was never identified.
150	7	"Once Bitten"	July 10, 2003
During the early morning hours of December 29, 1991, Kim Ancona is murdered in a Phoenix, Arizona bar. At the crime scene, investigators find a shoe-print, several foreign hairs, and unknown fingerprints. But they believe the most telling piece of evidence is the bite mark on the victim's chest. Based on his bite pattern, a local postman, Ray Krone, is charged, tried and convicted of murder, but he maintains his innocence. Ten years into his sentence, improved technology yields new information about old evidence, and Krone is exonerated. DNA leads to Kenneth Phillip's conviction.
151	8	"All Wet"	June 18, 2003
On November 7, 1994, Maryann Fullerton-Boczkowski, wife of Timothy Boczkowski, died of an apparent drowning at her home in Pennsylvania. This led to the investigation of the 1990 death of Mary Elaine Boczkowski, Timothy's first wife, in North Carolina. The similarities in the cases were striking, and medical examiners had to determine if the suspect's story about accidental drowning was all wet. Timothy was convicted of the murders of both his wives and was sentenced to life in prison.
152	9	"Shot of Vengeance"	September 20, 2003
In 1994, a 34-year-old nurse, Janice Trahan, experiences a variety of flu-like symptoms. None of her doctors are able to discover the cause, until she visits the gynecologist for a routine check-up. Then she learns she has something far worse than the flu. She is HIV-positive. Being a nurse, she could have contracted the HIV virus in any number of ways. In the end, science was able to determine not only how she had been infected, but also by whom, her former lover Dr. Richard J. Schmidt. The worst part: It was not an accident. Schmidt had deliberately poisoned Janice in an attempt to kill her as revenge for breaking off their relationship. Schmidt was convicted of attempted murder and sentenced to 50 years of hard labor.
153	10	"Dinner and a Movie"	October 26, 2003
In 1985, the time of death becomes pivotal after a pregnant woman, Ellen Sherman, is found murdered in her air-conditioned bedroom. A striking similarity between her death and the 1985 HBO movie Blackout gives forensic examiners the clues they need to thaw out the alibi of a cold-blooded killer, her estranged husband Edward Sherman. Ellen had decided to end the couple's 16-year marriage because she hated Edward's infidelity, and Edward was upset because he had become accustomed to his luxurious lifestyle, and if Ellen divorced him, he would lose almost all of it. Edward strangled Ellen to death before he left on a sailing trip, turning on the air conditioning to its coldest setting to hide the time of death. Edward was convicted of murdering his wife and sentenced to 50 years in prison.
154	11	"A Wrong Foot"	December 1, 2003
In July 1991, Police were puzzled by an obscure print found at a crime scene in Peoria, Illinois where one man, 21-year-old Tommy Smith, had been killed and two teenage girls, Casey Johnson and Smith’s fiancée Jennifer Logsdon, were seriously injured. Neither of the girls could identify their attacker, but one simple, yet rarely found, clue helped track the footsteps of a killer, Gene A. Brown, Jr. Brown lived next door to the girls, and admitted he broke in looking for drug money, but Tommy woke up and started a fight, which led to things spiraling out of control. Prosecutors didn’t buy the motive and were convinced Brown’s true intentions were to rape and kill Casey and Jennifer as he thought Tommy had left. However, they couldn’t prove it, and ultimately decided to let it go as to not jeopardize the case. Brown managed to cut a deal and avoid trial, and in exchange pleaded guilty; he received a total of 60 years for the two assaults and a life sentence for the murder.
155	12	"Order Up"	January 6, 2004
On October 22, 1993, Gerry Boggs was found shot to death in his Steamboat Springs, Colorado home, and his ex-wife, Jill Coit has a perfect alibi: She was camping with her boyfriend, Michael Backus, in a state park, 150 miles away. Determining time of death becomes critically important, and in order to do so, investigators need to know when the victim ate his last meal. An endocrinologist, a forensic botanist, and a short-order cook answer their question. Gerry had actually been killed after breakfast, for when Jill did not have an alibi, and further forensic evidence proved she was the killer.
156	13	"When the Dust Settled"	March 23, 2004
In 1998, 39-year-old Joe Foley (alias Joe Doyle used in the episode), a union official, is executed in his home not long after a strike by the union membership. Neither his wife, Kathleen Foley (alias Katy used in the episode), who was sleeping in the adjacent bedroom, nor anyone in the neighborhood, heard any gunshots. It would take a forensic sound test, an electron microscope, and a nightgown to explain why. It turned out that Katy was having an affair, and killed Joe so she could be with her lover, intending to frame someone in the union. Katy Doyle was sentenced to life in prison for the first-degree murder of her husband.
157	14	"A Welcome Intrusion"	March 18, 2004
In 1995, Mark Winger tells police that he shot an intruder, 24-year-old Roger Harrington, who had attacked and murdered his wife, Donnah Brown Winger. The husband paints a tragic picture of harassment, stalking, and revenge and is dubbed a hero for his valiant attempt to save his wife. Four years later, new forensic evidence leads police to re-examine the motives of this so-called hero. Eventually, an analysis of the recording of Winger’s 911 call exposed the truth; it caught Harrington groaning and being shot a second time. Winger had in fact invited Harrington to his home and shot him, then killed his wife when she ran in upon hearing the noise, but was forced to shoot Harrington again while on the phone, all in a plot to kill Donnah so he could be with another woman. But the recording blew the whole plan apart, and Winger was sentenced to life without parole.
158	15	"Within Arm's Reach"	April 23, 2004
Police officer Paul Dunn, accused of killing his estranged wife, Monica Sanchez-Dunn, insists she committed suicide. Investigators say it was murder and that it was physically impossible for the woman to have shot herself. The crime scene evidence is interpreted differently by the defense and prosecution, and eventually, it is revealed that it would have been impossible for Paul to shoot Monica the way the gun was fired, and that Monica really had committed suicide. After being acquitted, Paul Dunn quit the police force and took a job as an oil company foreman.
159	16	"Private Thoughts"	August 26, 2004
When firefighters found an entire family dead inside their home on August 29, 1994 (41-year-old Blaine Hodges shot to death in the master bedroom, his wife, 37-year-old Teresa, strangled to death on the sofa, and their two daughters, 11-year-old Winter and 3-year-old Anna, shot to death in their bedroom), it looked like a murder-suicide by Blaine, but there were several inconsistent clues in the rubble. Could ballistics, a time card, and some secret audiotapes unravel the mystery? The killer, Earl Bramblett, was charged with the murders, and was sentenced to death. On April 9, 2003, he was executed by the electric chair, as Bramblett requested to be electrified instead of lethal injection.
160	17	"Brotherhoods"	November 29, 2004
On July 1, 1999, gay couple Gary Mattson and Winfield Mowder were shot to death while sleeping in their bed. One night later, an arson fire destroyed a family planning clinic. Investigators wondered, whether some shards of glass, paint chips and a chicken feather could link for what appeared to be two separate crimes. The link was attached to homophobic brothers Matthew and Tyler Williams, the former of whom committed suicide while awaiting trial, while the latter pled guilty to arson and murder and was sentenced to life in prison.
161	18	"Hair of the Dog"	August 29, 2003
With no forensic evidence upon finding 28-year-old recluse John Helble murdered in his North Liberty, Iowa home on February 23, 1999, investigators were baffled. But they suspected that the victim's dog, Keisha, had witnessed the crime happen a month earlier. If she had, forensic scientists would need some way to find out what the dog had seen. That would be determined by analyzing Keisha's DNA to one of the suspects' cars, a test that implicated John's best friend Andy Rich as the killer. Rich had shot Helble in order to steal money for drugs, but got Keisha’s hair all over himself in the process. Rich ended up confessing to the murder mid-trial and was sentenced to 35 years.
162	19	"Breaking News"	August 31, 2003
On July 11, 1994, 22-year-old TV news producer Hope Hall was found raped and stabbed to death in her Petersburg, Virginia apartment. Police identify two suspects, Robert Kinney and Leroy Quick, both ex-boyfriends of the victim, but both are cleared of any wrongdoing. The case stalls for more than a year, and then investigators turn to the Commonwealth of Virginia's DNA Databank which houses profiles of more than 8,000 convicted felons, and is the first of its kind in the nation. A comparison of the crime scene evidence with the Databank profiles results in Virginia's first cold hit in a homicide investigation, and reveals the identity of the killer, 16-year-old Shermaine Johnson, who was convicted and sentenced to death.
163	20	"All the World's a Stage"	September 3, 2003
On August 1, 1989, police in Miami are dispatched to the scene of a shooting and discover the victim's husband, Ted MacArthur, is one of their own, a homicide detective who says his wife, Pilar Sanchez Nicolau-MacArthur, accidentally shot herself in the head. The detective maintains he called 911 immediately, but the evidence seems to indicate otherwise. Investigators turn to a forensic scientist and a ballistics expert to learn what really happened and who was responsible. It turned out Ted had murdered Pilar for her life insurance due to lavish spending on his mistress, and his call to police was delayed while he cleaned up. Ted MacArthur was sentenced to life in prison for his wife's murder.
164	21	"The Big Chill"	September 10, 2003
For years, a woman suffered from what appeared to be the unpleasant side effects of lithium, a drug prescribed to treat bipolar disorder. Her search for help led her to numerous doctors and hospitals and resulted in a 4000-page medical file. When she died, investigators had to determine if her death was due to natural causes, suicide, or murder.
165	22	"Bound for Jail"	September 17, 2003
In 1986, 36-year-old Jeanette Kirby was found dead in a ravine near a jogging path. Crucial crime scene evidence had been washed away by severe thunderstorms. Twice, the trail turned cold. Then, almost 20 years later, an old hat and a chip of stainless steel no longer than a fingernail brought the killer, David Draheim, to justice. Draheim was convicted of Jeanette’s murder and sentenced to 60 years in prison.
166	23	"Sphere of Influence"	September 20, 2003
In 1991, when 11-year-old Mandy Lemaire disappeared from a small town in a remote area of Alaska, investigators wondered if she had been attacked by a bear or become lost in the dense woods. It turned out neither was true. Her body was discovered 10 days later; she had been shot twice at close range, and sexually assaulted. A tip from an eyewitness led police to Charlie Smith-Hart, and trace evidence found at the crime scene convinced a jury of his guilt.
167	24	"Nailed"	September 22, 2003
On August 22, 1985, just weeks before Helena Greenwood is to testify against the man accused of sexually assaulting her, she is found murdered in the front yard of her suburban San Diego home by her husband, Roger. Investigators immediately suspect Helena's attacker, David Paul Freidioni, but they do not have enough evidence to prove his guilt. It would take fifteen years, and the remarkable advances in forensic science and DNA testing which occurred during that time, to enable police to nail Freidioni for murder, and he was ultimately sentenced to life.
168	25	"Sign of the Zodiac"	April 18, 2005
For six years, a serial killer prowled the streets of New York City. He wrote letters to police and The New York Post, indicating he would kill twelve people, one for each astrological sign. Forensic astronomy, handwriting analysis, and DNA extracted from the flap of an envelope gave investigators a profile of the killer, and a stroke of luck enabled them to find him.
169	26	"Letter Perfect"	December 10, 2003
In 1992, a healthy young man, 23-year-old Michael Hunter, dies mysteriously in his sleep. There are no signs of trauma or injury, but toxicology tests reveal a lethal dose of lidocaine in his blood. Investigators find a suicide note and presume he killed himself, until a forensic linguist examines the note and determines that what the victim said is less important than how he said it. Police eventually discover that Hunter's roommate, medical student Joseph Mannino, gave Hunter an injection of lidocaine for his migraines, but accidentally killed Hunter by giving him too much. Mannino was sentenced to 7 years in prison for involuntary manslaughter and banned from ever practicing medicine. Some investigators, however, suspect that Mannino intended to kill Hunter because they were in a love triangle with the same woman, but this was never proved.
170	27	"True Lies"	June 29, 2005
In the summer of 1986, 30-year-old Kathleen Lipscomb was found strangled to death on a deserted road outside of San Antonio. Months passed, then years, and the crime was never solved. Then Kathleen's family hired a private investigator who discovered a diary among her personal effects. Two of the diary entries helped police to piece together what had happened to Kathleen Lipscomb and why. Kathleen's estranged husband, Bill, a Navy pilot, killed her after she threatened to expose his cheating on military exams if he tried to get custody of their children in the divorce. Bill Lipscomb was convicted of murdering his wife and was sentenced to life in prison.
171	28	"Bed of Deceit"	August 4, 2005
58-year-old retired police officer and maintenance worker Dan McDonnell is discovered in his bed, dead of a single gunshot wound to the head. His wife Cynthia first says the motive was robbery; then she tells police he committed suicide. It would take careful examination of the evidence at the crime scene, the tape from a bank surveillance camera, and forensic textbooks found in the victim's home to write the final chapter of this real-life whodunit. Eventually, Cynthia McDonnell is convicted of first-degree murder, and at the request of her daughter, is given the maximum penalty: life without parole.
172	29	"Smoke in your Eyes"	September 9, 2005
On March 19, 1999, a suspicious fire swept through an Iowa City, Iowa apartment, killing two young women; 29-year-old Laura Dalton and 27-year-old Maria Lehner. The cause of the fire and the identity of the victims were unclear. But a closer look at the fire scene revealed something hidden in the ashes. Could gas chromotography, a burnt pair of eyeglasses, and a half smoked cigarette solve the case? Indeed it would, as Jonathan Memmer was soon caught with a burned nose and Maria's blood on his shoes. He had killed both women because they rejected his advances, and was sentenced to life in prison.
173	30	"Flower Power"	October 15, 2005
Two different men, Larry Fleck and Patrick Walsh, called police to report the same murder; Pamela Sweeney, Larry's fiance and Patrick's co-worker. Apparently, neither one knew that the other had called. The investigation uncovered, even more unusual circumstances. But a few tiny seeds, and a discarded candy wrapper were more than just insignificant clues. They told a story of revenge. Patrick had killed Pamela out of jealousy and received a life sentence.
174	31	"Past Lives"	November 20, 2005
The body of 34-year-old wealthy American businessman Madison Rutherford was found in his rental car. The car had swerved off the road into a ravine, and caught fire. Teeth and bone fragments were all that remained of the body; miraculously, an engraved wristwatch and medic alert bracelet had escaped the inferno and were found in the ashes. When Rutherford's wife filed a claim for $7 million of life insurance, investigators sought the help of a renowned forensic anthropologist. His findings and the work of other forensic scientists uncovered a chilling scheme of fraud and deceit. Madison had stolen a body from a cemetery, burned the car, and then gone into hiding. Note: This episode later influenced a law enforcement official to successfully pursue the investigation of an insurance fraudster who committed murder (rather than use a pre-existing cadaver) to similarly fake his own death - as detailed in season 14 episode "A Squire's Riches".
175	32	"Over and Out"	December 26, 2005
When a pipe bomb ripped through a rural home, killing 17-year-old Christopher Marquis and seriously injuring his mother, Sheila Rockwell, police had no idea who was responsible. A lot number on a 9-volt battery and the remnants of a mailing label found on a computer's hard drive enabled investigators to determine who sent the bomb and why. Investigators eventually deduced that trucker Christopher Dean sent the bomb as revenge for Marquis scamming him into buying a CB radio that was cheaper than the model he had thought he had purchased, not knowing the seller was a teenager. Dean was sentenced to life without parole.
176	33	"Death by a Salesman"	January 31, 2005
No one in a quiet residential community saw or heard anything unusual the day one of their neighbours, Eskalene DeBorde, was brutally attacked and murdered. Fingerprints found at the crime scene and surveillance video from a security camera helped investigators to apprehend the presumed killer, 21-year-old Rodger Broadway, a magazine salesman, within twelve hours, even though he had already left the state and was on a bus, headed for New York City. Broadway had killed Eskalene because she had caught him burglarizing her house, and after seeing all the evidence against him, he pled guilty and was sentenced to life without parole.
177	34	"Web of Seduction"	March 8, 2005
48-year-old Bruce Miller was shot to death in the office of the junkyard business he owned. The crime scene was almost pristine. In the untidy office which had not been cleaned for years, there should have been footprints, or fingerprints, or foreign hairs and fibers – but there were not. When a computer forensics expert examined the computers owned by the wife, 28-year-old Sharee Miller, and her lover, Gerry Cassaday, a Kansas City homicide detective who had recently just committed suicide, he found all the evidence needed to convict Sharee of murder. Sharee had hired Gerry to kill Bruce by tricking him into thinking Bruce had been abusing her, that she was pregnant with twins by Gerry, and Bruce had caused her to miscarry. However, all of these were lies to rile up Gerry into committing the murder – the pregnancy and the bruises on Sharee's body were both fake. Gerry, however, fell for it and killed Bruce as planned, using his experience as a homicide detective to cover his tracks, only to be double-crossed by Sharee afterwards, which drove him to suicide. Sharee was sentenced to life without parole.
178	35	"Grounds for Indictment"	December 2, 2004
On September 26, 2002, a drive-by shooting left one man dead and another seriously wounded. Cell phone calls and shell casings point to a suspect, but authorities are unable to place him at the crime scene. When a forensic geologist compared soil from the crime scene with soil found in the wheel wells of the suspect's car, he proved that dirt is anything but dumb.
179	36	"Duelling Confessions"	May 31, 2005
When Rosemary Anderson is found dead on the side of the road, her boyfriend becomes the prime suspect. He eventually confessed to her murder, but so did another man – serial killer Eric Edgar Cooke. John Button would continue to serve five years imprisonment for the manslaughter of his girlfriend. It would take the passage of another forty years, an author, and an expert in the field of pedestrian accident reconstruction to determine who was telling the truth.
180	37	"Traces of Truth"	June 24, 2004
A high school gym teacher mysteriously left town without saying goodbye to anyone. He later sent letters to explain why. But a closer forensic look at those letters and a microscopic piece of tissue gave investigators an entirely different explanation for where he went and why.
181	38	"Honor thy Father"	May 19, 2004
A sixteen-year-old girl was killed by her mother and father, in her own home. Her parents said they acted in self-defense, but the forensic evidence indicated otherwise. Definitive proof would come from an unlikely source: a recording made by an FBI electronic surveillance device.
182	39	"Hack Attack"	September 4, 2005
A mysterious computer crash pushed a thriving manufacturing company to the brink of collapse, jeopardizing the jobs of hundreds of employees. There was no apparent cause; there were no obvious clues. Forensic investigators had to determine if the crash was the result of a computer defect, human error, or sabotage.
183	40	"Deadly Curve"	October 10, 2004
It was supposed to be a routine motorcade for the Queen of the United Kingdom. But on the way to Yosemite National Park, a car carrying three Secret Service agents collided with a car driven by a deputy from the local sheriff's office. The agents were killed instantly. In the investigation which followed, two teams of accident reconstructionists reached very different conclusions. It would take a court case and a judge's ruling to determine what really happened and who was responsible.
184	41	"Visibility Zero"	November 15, 2004
On September 22, 1993, the Amtrak Railroad experienced the deadliest train crash in United States history when the Sunset Limited derailed while crossing Alabama's Big Bayou Canot bridge. Forty seven passengers and crew were killed; scores more were injured. The clues to the cause of the crash lay etched in twisted steel and buried in the mud of the Big Bayou Canot.
185	42	"Flashover"	December 21, 2004
On November 18, 1987, a fire erupted in the Kings Cross Underground Station in London, killing 31 people and injuring dozens more. Arson investigators were able to pinpoint the cause of the fire, but it would take state-of-the-art computer technology and experts in the field of fluid dynamics to explain why it became a deadly inferno.
