= European Workers Party =

European Workers' Party Europeiska arbetarpartiet
- Leader: Kjell Lundqvist
- Ideology: LaRouchism; Bretton Woods system Statism; Conspiracism; Anti-environmentalism
- Political position: Syncretic; Far-right
- International affiliation: LaRouche movement

Website
- www.larouche.se (defunct)

The European Workers' Party (Swedish: Europeiska arbetarpartiet, EAP) is a minor political party in Sweden without parliamentary representation. The party is the Swedish section of the LaRouche Movement.

== History ==
The movement was established as the European Labour Committees (ELC) in 1974 by two American LaRouchians, William "Bill" Jones and Michael Vale. Bill Jones had lived in Sweden since 1968, as an apparent Vietnam war deserter. The movement started to build its organization around the young Swedish student Kerstin Tegin, later Tegin-Gaddy, and her American husband to-be Clifford G. Gaddy. However, the party never became much bigger than a handful of people. During this period, Sweden was one of the few countries that openly harboured and encouraged American GIs in Vietnam to defect, and it is often insinuated that EAP was set up in Sweden by the CIA to label the defectors as left-wing extremists.

The EAP launched campaigns in the 1980s based on what was described by the Swedish government as "extreme hatred of Swedish PM Olof Palme". A 2002 government report stated:

It became increasingly common in the media to characterize the EAP as "fascist" or "right-wing extremist". One reason for this was the pronounced anti-sovietism [of the party], its extreme hatred of Olof Palme, and its adherence to anti-semitic jargon and conspiracy theories.

After the Olof Palme assassination in 1986, the group was for a time suspected by the police of being connected to the murder, although this theory was soon dropped. Victor Gunnarsson, who had been a member for a year before being kicked out in 1985, was arrested and questioned by police about the assassination before being released. Dean Andromidas, from the LaRouche organisation's Executive Intelligence Review, claims there was a radio broadcast on Swedish National Radio in August 1992 by Herbert Brehmer, former leading operative of the East German Stasi and author of Auftrag: Irreführung. Wie die Stasi Politik im Westen machte. Andromidas claimed that Brehmer "explained how his Department 10, responsible for disinformation, put into motion a preplanned disinformation operation to pin the blame for the murder of Palme on LaRouche and his Swedish associates." According to another LaRouche associate, Jeffrey Steinberg, South African interests lie behind the murder and the EAP was to blame for the murder. LaRouche issued a statement on the allegations made against his organization.

However, as a result of the hard pressure put on the EAP after the Olof Palme assassination, the party was thrown into disarray, numerous members left the party, the party left its Stockholm headquarters and more or less went underground, and leaders of the party – the Gaddys – abandoned the party and left Sweden for the USA, where they eventually pursued successful academic careers.

The Paris office of the party received minor damage in a bomb blast in April 1986.

== Election history ==
The EAP had its best election in 1985 when they received 369 votes.

In the 1990s, the party kept a relatively low profile, but it has resurfaced in the early 21st century and ran for national parliament and the local assembly of Botkyrka in the Swedish election in September 2006. The party only received 83 votes (0.0015%) in the election for the national parliament, and 64 votes (0.16%) in the local election in Botkyrka.

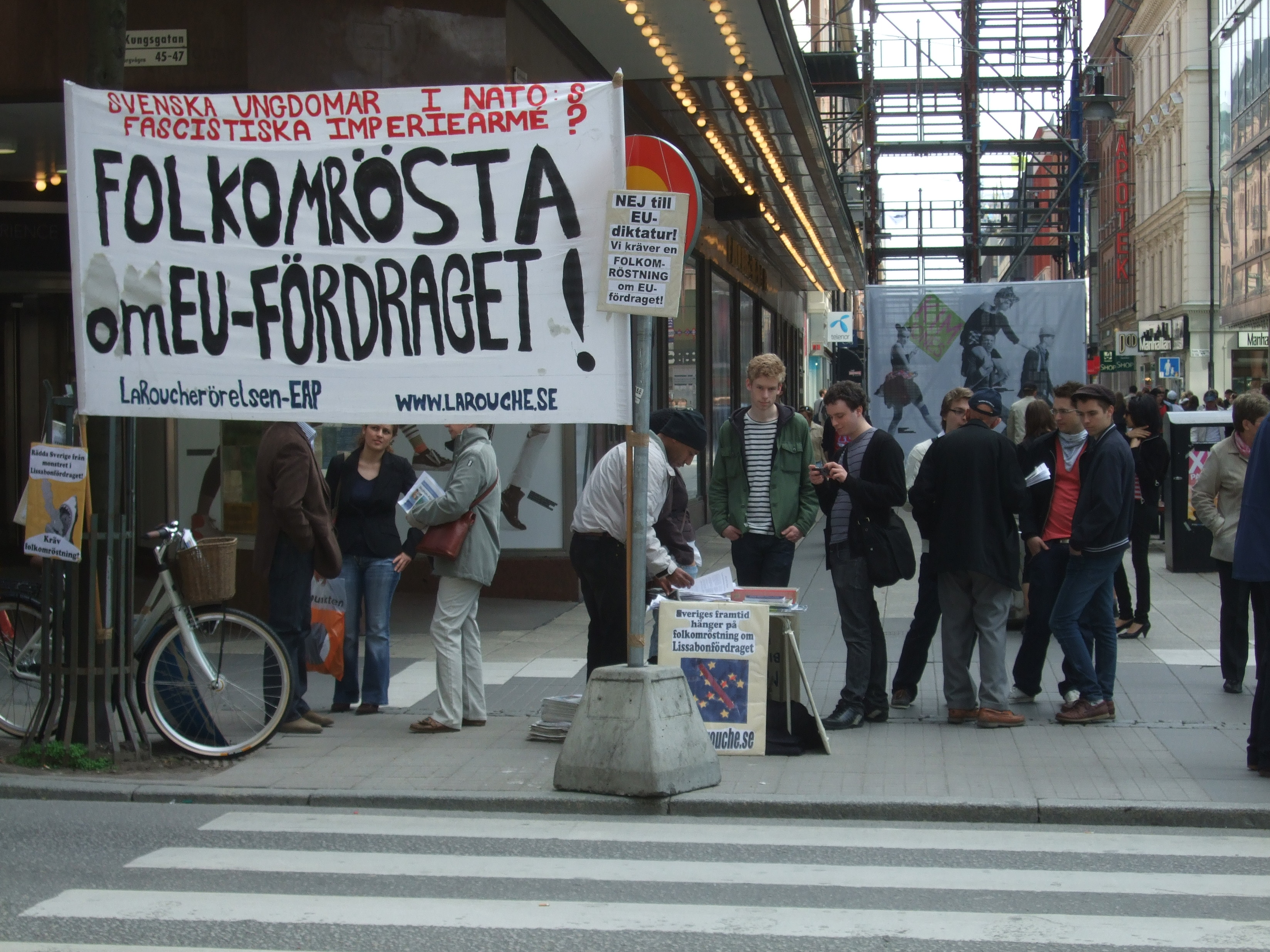
LaRouche supporters in Stockholm protesting the Treaty of Lisbon.

== Party leaders ==
- Kerstin Tegin-Gaddy, 1976–1986
- Michael Ericson, 1986–2003
- Ulf Sandmark, 2003–2007
- Hussein Askary, 2007–present
