= Forensic Files season 9 =

Forensic Files
- Season 9
- No. of episodes: 30

Release
- Original network: Court TV
- Original release: June 3, 2004 – June 28, 2007

Season chronology
- ← Previous; Season 8 Next → Season 10

Forensic Files is an American documentary-style series which reveals how forensic science is used to solve violent crimes, mysterious accidents, and even outbreaks of illness. The series was broadcast on Court TV, narrated by Peter Thomas, and produced by Medstar Television, in association with Court TV Original Productions. It has broadcast 406 episodes since its debut on TLC in 1996 as Medical Detectives.

== Episodes ==
No. overall	No. in season	Title	Original release date
186	1	"Road Rage"	June 2, 2004
The investigation of a discarded sleeping bag containing bloody sneakers and a purse leads police to the body of a young woman, Carrie Love. Evidence from the autopsy and the crime scene was carefully collected and analyzed, but it would be a mark found on the victim's body which would enable police to track the killer, Jesse Pratt, who was convicted and sentenced to death.
187	2	"Hunter or Hunted"	June 9, 2004
On the last day of deer hunting season in 1992, a woman is killed while walking her dogs in the woods. The victim has no enemies and her husband has an alibi, so police assume it was a hunting accident... until a strange letter turns up, allegedly written by the woman before her death. Police begin to wonder if the woman may have been the target all along, and a forensic document examiner, a slingshot, and an unusual physics experiment answer their question.
188	3	"In Harm's Way"	June 15, 2004
On November 9, 1995, a police officer found a woman's body while on routine patrol of a Anchorage, Alaska public park. Kathryn Harms had been stabbed to death and, during the autopsy, the medical examiner preserved the portion of her rib cage which sustained the fatal wound. A knife thought to be the murder weapon turned up days later, two thousand miles away. Forensic scientists now had an opportunity which seldom occurs, to compare the microscopic marks on the presumed murder weapon with the marks on the victim's bone.
189	4	"No Corpus Delicti"	June 21, 2004
Michele Cecile Wallace disappears without a trace; even though foul play is suspected, the leads don't pan out and the trail turns cold. Twenty years would pass before police are able to link a clump of hair discovered in an isolated area. Members of "NecroSearch", a group of volunteer forensic scientists, searched a remote area of Colorado a meter at a time, found the victim's body, and gave authorities the evidence they needed to bring Roy Melanson to justice.
190	5	"News at 11"	June 27, 2004
On February 9, 1991, a talented television news anchor, Diane King, was shot to death outside her home; it appeared to be a crime of passion, perpetrated by an obsessed fan. A police dog tracked the scent of the killer through the adjacent woods and back to the crime scene. Could the murderer be one of the onlookers, watching the police conduct their investigation? Ultimately, it was revealed Diane’s husband Brad was the killer, and he was imprisoned for life.
191	6	"Burning Desire"	July 28, 2004
Investigators sifted through the ashes of a fire which had killed a 40-year-old Sandra Maloney, the estranged wife of a Green Bay, Wisconsin police officer. At first glance, the fire appeared to have been started by an unattended cigarette. But when forensic scientists looked closely, they discovered the cause was far more complicated.
192	7	"Cloak of Deceit"	July 9, 2004
For seven years, a trio of men robbed one bank after another. They always got away before the police arrived, and they left no evidence behind. But the way they stood and the clothes they wore told a story that could be read by forensic scientists.
193	8	"Bad Medicine"	July 8, 2004
A young woman suddenly becomes critically ill; her symptoms worsen over time, eventually leaving her unable to walk. Then a bone marrow test reveals the cause: arsenic. Investigators now had to determine if the poisoning was caused by groundwater contamination or something much more sinister.
194	9	"Stick 'em Up"	June 21, 2007
In 1989, residents of Noel, Missouri were stunned to learn that their bank had been robbed and the recently divorced bank president, 51-year-old Dan Short, was missing. His body was later found floating in a lake, securely bound to a chair with duct tape. When the tape was carefully reassembled using a technique known as end match analysis, investigators discovered one piece was missing. It would be that piece, and tips from concerned citizens, which would solve the crime. This technique ultimately led to the capture of the bank robbers, who were subsequently sentenced to life.
195	10	"Head Games"	July 22, 2004
In 1976, a young couple decided to celebrate their first wedding anniversary with a camping trip to Mount Hood. During the trip, the husband was shot and killed, and his wife told two different versions of the events which led to his death. Forensic psychiatry finally enabled her to distinguish fact from fiction, and the evidence from ballistics tests allowed investigators to determine what really happened.
196	11	"Making the Collar"	June 28, 2007
The body of 16-year-old Leanne Tiernan was discovered nine months after she disappeared. Forensic scientists found clues that painted a virtual portrait of her killer. They knew he had a dog, he worked for the postal service, and that he had red carpeting in his home. Now all they had to do was find him. Thanks to the collar being ordered online, police traced it back to 45-year-old John Taylor, whom they managed to prove was the culprit despite him getting rid of the most damning evidence. Taylor was a sexual predator, and when he saw Leanne on her way home while walking his dog, he abducted her, then raped and killed her in his home before storing her body in his freezer for nine months. Taylor was sentenced to two terms of life imprisonment for kidnapping and murder, and the sentence was later doubled after DNA proved he had committed one brutal rape and he subsequently confessed to another. Taylor is also being considered the prime suspect in 4 other murders.
197	12	"The Financial Downfall"	August 11, 2004
In 1987, 20-year-old Donna Hartman, a Navy officer's estranged wife, fell to her death from a cliff overlooking the Pacific Ocean while on vacation with friends Virginia and B.J. McGinniss. Initially, investigators thought it was a tragic accident. But after a forensic examination of photographs taken at the scene, police had a very different picture of what had happened. They soon exposed Virginia as a serial killer who murdered not only her previous husbands, children, and other relatives, but also her friends, all for collecting life insurance. Virginia and B.J. had drugged Donna during lunch that day, after which B.J. pushed Donna off the cliff and they staged it to look like an accident. Virginia was sentenced to life in prison, but B.J. died of natural causes while awaiting trial.
198	13	"A Daughter's Journey"	August 23, 2004
Haunted by the disappearance of her mother some twenty years earlier, a young woman undertook an investigation of her own. Her mother's diary was in the now cold case file; there, in her mother's own handwriting, she discovered a dark family secret, which might have been the reason her mother vanished.
199	14	"Over a Barrel"	August 24, 2004
California police had several suspects in the 1984 robbery and brutal murder of an elderly couple, Cliff and Alma Merck. The forensic evidence was inconclusive, and the crime initially went unsolved. Ten years later, a determined forensic scientist used material from a dentist's office to uncover ballistic evidence which had been overlooked. He not only solved the crime, but he also made scientific history.
200	15	"Pinned by the Evidence"	August 24, 2004
In 1996, after a street fight took the life of a national wrestling champion, police had to determine if he was killed in cold blood or in self-defense. A jury decided it was murder, and sentenced the accused to a minimum of twenty years in prison. Six years later, he was granted another trial; a forensic animator who testified on his behalf offered a different explanation for the most damning piece of evidence.
201	16	"Cries Unheard"	August 25, 2004
On June 15, 2000, 19-year-old Devon Guzman was found dead in her car; the scene had been staged to make the murder appear to be suicide. During their investigation, police discovered the victim was involved in a love quadrangle, giving several people a motive to kill her. The killer's identity would be revealed by a piece of evidence found in a suspect's trash. On October 5, 2001, Michelle Hetzel and Brandon Bloss were sentenced to life in prison without parole for Devon Guzman’s murder.
202	17	"Buried Treasure"	August 26, 2004
42-year-old Melvin Snyder disappeared one year to the day after beginning an affair with his friend Ron Harshman's wife Teresa. They had briefly eloped to Montana, but after three weeks they'd ended their affair and returned to their spouses. 15 years later, with the help of a metal detector, police found evidence which would prove what had happened and who was responsible. Harshman had ultimately discovered the affair, and despite knowing it had ended, he felt betrayed and killed Snyder as a result. Prosecutors managed to get a conviction despite never finding Snyder’s body, and Harshman was sentenced to life without parole.
203	18	"Badge of Betrayal"	September 22, 2004
The body of a young California co-ed was found under an isolated ramp off the Interstate, and San Diego Police had no idea who would want this girl dead. But their questions would be answered when they discovered a tiny, unique fiber on the victim's clothing, which led them straight to the most unlikely of killers.
204	19	"Deadly Matrimony"	September 29, 2004
In 1974, Janice Hartman, a go-go dancer recently divorced from John Smith, told her family she needed to get away for a while, and then she simply disappeared. Investigators were suspicious because she took neither her car nor her clothes. The next twenty years passed slowly, and the family began to think they might never know what happened, until they received a phone call from the sister of the next missing wife of John Smith.
205	20	"Muddy Waters"	October 13, 2004
Colorado hunter Bruce Dodson, who'd been shot three times and killed while on a hunting trip with his new wife Janice, was the victim of a well-planned crime, not an accidental shooting. Investigators found a .243 caliber bullet in his lung and a .308 caliber shell casing near his body and suspected they were looking for two murder weapons, and two killers. They also had two suspects, both of whom had also been camping in the area; a witness who had reported the crime, and Jason Lee, Janice's first husband who'd left her for one of their daughter's friends. But analysis of the forensic evidence pointed them in a different direction, and they soon discovered that the entire thing was a plot by Janice to eliminate both her husbands, live off Bruce's life insurance, and get revenge on Jason for abandoning her. When she found out Jason was camping in the same forest, she made sure she and Bruce set up camp as close to Jason as possible without arousing suspicion. The morning of the murder, Janice waded through a nearby swamp to Jason's campsite to avoid being seen, wearing coveralls and rubber boots she had secretly brought with her to keep her clothes clean. When Jason left his tent, Janice stole his hunting rifle and followed Bruce on his morning hunt until he was alone. She then killed him and disposed of the gun, positive she had been successful in framing Jason. However, her plan fell apart when she tracked mud from the swamp into Jason's tent. A forensic analysis of the mud was all it took to exonerate Jason and prove his ex-wife's guilt. In 2000, Janice Dodson was sentenced to life without parole for the first-degree murder of Bruce Dodson and for attempting to frame Jason Lee.
206	21	"Point of Origin"	October 27, 2004
In 1984, California firefighters had battled ten arson fires in three weeks. When cigarettes and a scrap of paper connected the southern California fires to several fires further north, the hunt was on for a dangerous pyromaniac. Investigators finally found a fingerprint, and it pointed to a most unlikely suspect.
207	22	"Seeds for Doubt"	October 7, 2004
In 2002, Guilford, New York was devastated when Patty Wlasiuk died when her truck went into a lake. Her husband Peter stated he narrowly escaped as the truck entered the water. Investigators initially thought alcohol was to blame, but blood tests proved the victim was not intoxicated. Burdock seed pods found in her hair and on her clothes would indicate that this was no accident but cold-blooded murder.
208	23	"Saving Face"	October 13, 2004
When a woman disappeared without a trace, there were two possible explanations: kidnapping or murder. Concern was heightened when police learned that two other women had vanished under similar circumstances. Careful investigation, the talents of a forensic artist, and DNA profiling enabled police to link the crimes to a single suspect – an immigrant known to prey upon vulnerable women.
209	24	"Northern Exposure"	December 8, 2004
Hikers near Anchorage, Alaska discovered a body wrapped in sheets, which were edged in orange stitching. Authorities hydrated the fingers and obtained a fingerprint, enabling them to identify the victim. Clinging to the sheet, they also discovered a tuft of red carpet fibers – threads of evidence, which led them straight to the killer.
210	25	"Silk Stalkings"	December 29, 2004
The news of a flight attendant's brutal murder prompted the son of a victim who had been killed five years earlier to contact the police. The MO of both murders was remarkably similar, and analysis of the biological evidence from the crime scenes proved that these were connected by Jeffrey Gorton.
211	26	"Fishing for the Truth"	October 31, 2004
A two-man shrimp boat sank when a fast-moving, violent storm struck the Louisiana coast. The captain drowned, and the deckhand was rescued fourteen hours later. He told the Coast Guard that the captain's foot had become entangled in the fishing nets; they tried frantically to free him, but they failed. The deckhand was considered a hero until the captain's body was found. Eventually, the public discovered that he was coerced into confessing to the captain's murder.
212	27	"For Love or Money"	January 19, 2005
When a wealthy real estate tycoon went missing, it appeared to be foul play. He had been aware that he was in danger. In his will, he left instructions regarding what was to happen if he died under violent circumstances – instructions which were carried out after a hiker came across a bullet-ridden skull.
213	28	"South of the Border"	February 2, 2005
The cold-blooded murder of an American tourist in a Mexican resort in 1991 focused law enforcement resources on both sides of the border. At first glance, the motive appeared to be robbery, but careful analysis of the forensic evidence pointed to something much more sinister. In 1992, Daniel Hayden Willoughby was convicted of murdering his wife Trish.
214	29	"The Stake-Out"	July 4, 2004
The investigation of the 1988 kidnapping of 37-year-old Sally Weiner, wife of prominent banker Harry Weiner, led police on a wild goose chase, tracking down disgruntled bank customers and examining computer fonts. Ultimately, Harry made a mistake during the ransom drop off, and Sally was later found dead in a farmer’s field. An unexpected discovery made by an entomologist resulted in a new suspect, and the realization that ordinary office equipment can leave behind extraordinary clues. It turned out that David Copenhefer, a bookstore owner who attended the same church as the Weiner family, had orchestrated the entire plot as revenge for Harry refusing him a loan. Copenhefer not only never intended to let Sally live (he killed her almost immediately after he kidnapped her), but also planned to kill Harry when he dropped off the ransom. But his plan went awry when he learned through an innocent friend that Harry had contacted the authorities, so Copenhefer didn’t go to collect the ransom for fear police had set up a sting. But Copenhefer was caught regardless, and sentenced to death for Sally Weiner’s murder.
215	30	"Walking Terror"	March 2, 2005
In the middle of the night, a neighbor watched in horror as a man stabbed his wife, pushed her into the swimming pool, and held her head under water. When questioned by the police, the husband not only had no explanation for his actions, but he also had no recollection of the crime. A jury would have to decide between the evidence at the scene and the mysteries of the mind.
