= John Smith (murderer) =

American murderer (born 1951)

John David Smith III
- Born: April 2, 1951 (age 75)
- Conviction: Murder
- Penalty: 15 years to life

Details
- Victims: 1 convicted, 1 other suspected
- Date: November 17, 1974
- States: Ohio, possibly New Jersey
- Imprisoned at: Marion Correctional Institution

John David Smith III (born April 2, 1951) is an American murderer convicted in 2001 of killing his first wife in 1974 and also has been indicted on charges for the 1991 murder of his second wife, though those charges were later dropped. Skull fragments found in a locker owned by him belong to a third unidentified woman; they're the basis of an ongoing "Jane Doe" inquiry. The FBI is also attempting to identify two women pictured in photographs found in John's collection at the time of his 2000 arrest.

== Background ==
Smith married Janice Hartman (born 2 March 1951) on 30 June 1970. The marriage was troubled; Janice's brother said that Smith was abusive from the start. Hartman left Smith in 1974 and returned to Ohio intending to divorce him, with the court granting the divorce decree on 14 November 1974. A few days later she told her family that she was going away for a while, and was last seen on 17 November 1974.

Soon after, Smith's brother Michael observed him building a narrow box which he claimed was for Janice's belongings. In 1979, their grandfather discovered the box and called Michael, who found inside it a dismembered corpse with rainbow hair which he believed to be Janice Hartman. He told John, who took the box away. Neither the brother nor grandfather informed local law enforcement. Hartman's remains were discovered in a makeshift coffin found in 1980 by highway workers in an Indiana field. However, the skeleton was only known as the "Lady in the Box", remaining unidentified until 2000. Smith married his second wife, Betty Fran Gladden-Smith, in March 1990. While confined to her home by an injury, she disappeared from West Windsor, New Jersey, on October 4, 1991. Michael Smith kept his secret until 1999, when he told the FBI about the box containing Hartman's body. Inquiries with law enforcement officials in Ohio and Indiana produced the box and remains, with Indiana authorities having kept the box since its discovery in 1980, with the remains exhumed from the grave where the authorities had buried them.

== Arrest and conviction ==
Smith was arrested in October 2000 in Escondido, California, where he was living with his third wife. He was convicted in July 2001 of the murder of Janice Hartman and sentenced to 15 years to life in prison. He unsuccessfully appealed his conviction in 2002. His first parole date was in 2011. The family of Janice Hartman sought civil damages against Smith's grandfather and brother for their alleged involvement in covering up Smith's crime for over twenty years, but the claims were unsuccessful.

As of 2019, Smith remained incarcerated at Marion Correctional Institution, where – on November 28, 2019 – he learned that he had been indicted for the 1991 murder of Gladden-Smith. In 2021, a judge ruled that the fact that Smith had been convicted of murdering his first wife will not be used as motive for murdering his second wife, Fran Gladden-Smith. The case was dropped in 2023, but reportedly Smith admitted to disposing of Gladden-Smith's body. Smith will be next eligible for parole in 2029.

== Popular culture ==
Smith is the subject of the television movie Murder on Pleasant Drive, episodes of Cold Case Files, in Forensic Files season 9, episode 19: "Deadly Matrimony", the books Stranger in my Bed by Michael Fleeman and My Sister Is Missing: Bringing a Killer to Justice by Sherrie Gladden-Davis. The case was also featured on Dateline NBC, Medical Detectives, Somebody’s Hiding Something (S1 E1), and Who The Bleep Did I Marry.
