= Jill Coit =

American convicted murderer

- Born: Jill Lonita Billiot; June 11, 1943 (age 83) or June 11, 1944 (age 82); Lafitte, Louisiana
- Height: 5 ft 6 in
- Partner: Michael Backus
- Status: Incarcerated
- Motive: Financial gain, threat of pending litigation
- Convictions: First-degree murder, conspiracy to commit first-degree murder
- Penalty: Life plus 47 years

Details
- Victims: 1 confirmed, 1 suspected
- Country: United States
- State: Colorado
- Location: Steamboat Springs
- Weapons: Stun gun, .22 caliber pistol
- Imprisoned at: Denver Women's Correctional Facility

Notes
- DOC Number: 86530

Jill Lonita Coit (née Billiot; born June 11, 1943, or 1944) is an American convicted murderer. A con artist and serial bigamist who has been married 11 times to nine different men since 1961, Coit was convicted of killing her eighth husband in 1993 and is also suspected of killing her third husband in 1972. Coit is serving a life sentence with no possibility of parole at the Denver Women's Correctional Facility.

== Biography ==
Coit was born Jill Lonita Billiot in Lafitte, Louisiana; she grew up in New Orleans. She is of Native American descent. Her upbringing was apparently normal and without any major trauma or unusual features, and she was described as popular at her school. She did not fare well academically and dropped out of high school in 1961 to marry her first husband. Less than a year later, she filed for divorce and liquidated their shared bank accounts.

She married for a second time, to Steven Moore, and gave birth to a son in 1964, filing for divorce soon afterward.

=== William Clark Coit, Jr. ===
Coit married engineer William Clark Coit, Jr. in January 1966 in Louisiana, while still legally married to Moore. The couple had two children, William Andrew Coit (called Andrew) and William Coit III. William Coit, Jr. adopted Jill's son from her previous marriage.

William Coit Jr. was killed on March 29, 1972, shot twice in the back by an apparent intruder shortly after he filed for divorce from Jill. She was suspected of the murder, but the police could never find sufficient evidence to charge her. Additionally, she checked herself into a mental hospital to avoid further questioning.

Shortly after Coit's death, Coit moved to California, where she persuaded an elderly gentleman to informally adopt her, and subsequently inherited "a large portion of his estate" after his death.

=== Additional marriages ===
Coit's fourth marriage was to Donald Charles Brodie, an officer in the U.S. Marine Corps. The couple divorced in 1975 after two years of marriage.

Coit later twice married and twice divorced one of the lawyers who represented her during the investigation into William Coit's murder.

While separated from her fifth husband, Coit married Eldon Duane Metzger in Ohio. In 1983, she married husband number seven, a schoolteacher in Indiana.

=== Gerald Boggs ===
While renovating a bed and breakfast with her sons, Coit regularly visited Gerald Boggs' hardware store in Steamboat Springs, Colorado. They struck up a relationship and, in 1991, Boggs, a 52-year-old bachelor, married her, becoming (unbeknown to him) her eighth husband. Boggs' brother Doug was concerned by Coit's excessive interest in her husband's finances. He hired a private investigator named Julie Prier-Lewis who exposed Coit as a complete fraud. She had been married nine times, had several aliases, had been involved in various financial and insurance scams, and was still legally married to her seventh husband. She had also faked a pregnancy, having had a hysterectomy. On the basis of this information, Boggs annulled the marriage after seven months.

After the annulment, Coit and Boggs were involved in an acrimonious lawsuit over the bed and breakfast business. Boggs had a substantial financial interest in the establishment that was complicated by her use of mortgage fraud, apparently to conceal her assets due to a financial judgment against her by yet another previous husband. The murder of Boggs happened shortly before the trial was scheduled to begin.

Coit briefly married for a ninth time before entering into a relationship with Michael Backus and convinced him to help her murder Boggs. In October 1993, they acted on their plot. Wearing a disguise which included a false mustache, Coit and Backus broke into Boggs's home. They shocked him with a stun gun, and ultimately murdered him using a .25 caliber pistol, later fleeing to Mexico.

Police quickly centered on Coit as a suspect. After she confided to her younger son Seth about the murder and asked for his help in covering it up, he instead went to the police. She was arrested in December 1993, during a visit from Mexico. Subsequent investigation, as well as testimony at her 1995 trial, revealed that she began making plans to murder Boggs as early as the summer of 1993, going as far as to solicit several people to come to Colorado and kill him. She was convicted of first-degree murder and conspiracy to commit first-degree murder and sentenced to life without possibility of parole plus an additional 47 years on the conspiracy charge. Michael Backus was also convicted and sentenced to life. His subsequent appeal was rejected.

Coit is currently serving her sentence at Denver Women's Correctional Facility. All of her appeals have been exhausted. In 2026, she applied for clemency.

== In media ==
=== Books ===
- The 1995 book Charmed to Death, by author Stephen Singular tells the story of Jill Coit's conviction for killing her husband, Gerry Boggs, and depicts her long history of bigamy and embezzlement.
- The 1995 book Poisoned Vows, by investigative journalist and true crime author Clifford L. Linedecker, is a biography of Coit and her criminal activities.

=== Television ===
Coit was portrayed by Bonnie Bedelia in the Fox made-for-television film Legacy of Sin: The William Coit Story (1995). Coit's story is told from the point of view of her son William Coit III (played by Neil Patrick Harris). The movie is based on the Stephen Singular book Charmed to Death.

Coit's exploits have been recounted by several true-crime documentary television series:

- Forensic Files, episode "Order Up" (season 8, episode 12), first aired in 2004.
- American Justice episode "Serial Wife" (season 13, episode 28), first aired in 2004 on the A&E Television Network. Host Bill Kurtis interviews prosecution and defense attorneys as well as reporters.
- The New Detectives episode "True Crime" (season 4, episode 14), aired in 1999.
- Deadly Women, episode "Fortune Hunters" (season 4, episode 3), first aired in 2010 on Investigation Discovery.
- Facing Evil with Candice DeLong, episode "The Black Widow Bride" (season 2, episode 5), first aired in 2011 on Investigation Discovery. Host Candice DeLong interviews Jill Coit in prison.
