= Vasquez v. Hillery =

- Supreme Court of the United States

Argued October 15, 1985 Decided January 14, 1986
- Full case name: Daniel Vasquez, Warden, v. Booker T. Hillery, Jr.
- Citations: 474 U.S. 254 (more) 106 S. Ct. 617; 88 L. Ed. 2d 598

Case history
- Prior: Writ of habeas corpus granted, Hillery v. Pulley, 563 F. Supp. 1228 (E.D. Cal. 1983); affirmed, 733 F.2d 644 (9th Cir. 1984); cert. granted, 470 U.S. 1026 (1985).

Holding
- A defendant's conviction must be reversed if members of his own race were systematically excluded from the grand jury that indicted him, even if he was convicted following an otherwise fair trial.

Court membership
- Chief Justice Warren E. Burger Associate Justices William J. Brennan Jr. · Byron White; Thurgood Marshall · Harry Blackmun; Lewis F. Powell Jr. · William Rehnquist; John P. Stevens · Sandra Day O'Connor

Case opinions
- Majority: Marshall, joined by Brennan, Blackmun, Stevens; White (all but the sixth paragraph of Part III)
- Concurrence: O'Connor (in judgment)
- Dissent: Powell, joined by Burger, Rehnquist

Laws applied
- U.S. Const. amend. XIV;

Vasquez v. Hillery, 474 U.S. 254 (1986), is a United States Supreme Court case, which held that a defendant's conviction must be reversed if members of their race were systematically excluded from the grand jury that indicted them, even if they were convicted following an otherwise fair trial.

== Background ==
An African-American man named Booker T. Hillery was indicted for murder by a California grand jury in 1962. Hillery was accused of stabbing a 15-year-old white girl named Marlene Miller with scissors in the small town of Hanford. Miller was said to be sewing a dress alone in the house and did not notice an intruder sneaking into the house. The perpetrator fought with the young woman, hogtied her and stabbed her in the chest.

=== Historical context ===
The original conviction of Hillery occurred in the early 1960s in California. At that time, America was in the middle of the Civil Rights Movement. Blacks were excluded from the indicting grand jury, which led Hillery to claim that he was denied equal protection rights guaranteed by the Fourteenth Amendment. He petitioned for a retrial on that basis.

=== Legal challenge ===
In 1978, Hillery filed a petition for a writ of habeas corpus in federal court, which granted the writ, citing grand jury discrimination. The Court of Appeals affirmed this ruling. In 1986, his original conviction was overturned by the U.S. Supreme Court. Hillery was retried later that year, and was again convicted in the second trial. The forensic evidence which helped convict Hillery in the second trial was examined in the 2003 episode of Forensic Files titled "Paintball". Hillery died on January 16, 2023, still incarcerated.

== Opinion of the Court ==
=== Majority ===
Justice Marshall delivered the opinion of the Court, stating:

When constitutional error calls into question the objectivity of those charged with bringing a defendant to judgment, a reviewing court can neither indulge a presumption of regularity nor evaluate the resulting harm. Accordingly, when the trial judge is discovered to have had some basis for rendering a biased judgment, his actual motivations are hidden from review, and we must presume that the process was impaired. Similarly, when a petite jury has been selected upon improper criteria or has been exposed to prejudicial publicity, we have required reversal of the conviction because the effect of the violation cannot be ascertained. Like these fundamental flaws, which never have been thought harmless, discrimination in the grand jury undermines the structural integrity of the criminal tribunal itself, and is not amenable to harmless-error review.

Marshall then went on to say:

The opinion of the Court in Mitchell ably presented other justifications, based on the necessity for vindicating Fourteenth Amendment rights, supporting a policy of automatic reversal in cases of grand jury discrimination...The six years since Mitchell have given us no reason to doubt the continuing truth of that observation.

=== Concurrence ===
Justice O'Connor concurred in the judgment. O'Connor stated:

I share the view expressed by Justice Powell in Rose: a petitioner who has been afforded by the state courts a full and fair opportunity to litigate the claim that blacks were discriminatorily excluded from the grand jury which issued the indictment should be foreclosed from relitigating that claim on federal habeas. The incremental value that continued challenges may have in rooting out and deterring such discrimination is outweighed by the unique considerations that apply when the habeas writ is invoked. The history and purposes of the writ, as well as weighty finality interests and considerations of federalism, counsel against permitting a petitioner to renew on habeas a challenge which does not undermine the justness of his trial, conviction, or incarceration.

=== Dissent ===
Justice Powell, joined by Chief Justice Burger and Justice Rehnquist, dissented, arguing that "the Court misapplies stare decisis because it relies only on decisions concerning grand jury discrimination. There is other precedent, including important cases of more recent vintage than those cited by the Court, that should control this case. Those cases hold, or clearly imply, that a conviction should not be reversed for constitutional error where the error did not affect the outcome of the prosecution".

Powell continues his dissent by mentioning that since Chapman v. California, "the Court has consistently made clear that it is the duty of a reviewing court to consider the trial record as a whole and to ignore errors that are harmless, including most constitutional violations." After citing cases where the Supreme Court applied harmless-error analysis or an analogous prejudice requirement on this basis, Powell stated:

Grand jury discrimination is a serious violation of our constitutional order, but so also are the deprivations of rights guaranteed by the Fourth, Fifth, Sixth, and Fourteenth Amendments to which we have applied harmless-error analysis or an analogous prejudice requirement. Moreover, grand jury discrimination occurs prior to trial, while the asserted constitutional violations in most of the above-cited cases occurred during trial. The Court does not adequately explain why grand jury discrimination affects the "integrity of the judicial process" to a greater extent than the deprivation of equally vital constitutional rights, nor why it is exempt from a prejudice requirement while other constitutional errors are not.

Finally, Powell believes that the Appellate Court's decision, overturning Hillery's conviction should be reversed because the "respondent's grand jury discrimination claim casts no doubt on the adequacy of the procedures used to convict him or on the sufficiency of the evidence of his guilt".
