= Murder of Rob Andrew =

2001 murder of an advertising executive in Oklahoma City

- Rob Andrew
- Location: Oklahoma City, Oklahoma, United States
- Date: November 20, 2001
- Attack type: Murder, mariticide
- Weapon: 16-gauge shotgun
- Deaths: Rob Andrew, 39
- Injuries: Brenda Andrew
- Motive: obtain the insurance money.
- Verdict: Guilty
- Convictions: First-degree murder Conspiracy
- Sentence: Death
- Convicted: Brenda Andrew; James Pavatt

On November 20, 2001, in Oklahoma City, Oklahoma, United States, 39-year-old advertising executive Robert Dale Andrew (September 19, 1962 – November 20, 2001) was shot and killed as part of a murder-for-hire plot hatched by James Dwight Pavatt (né Bowling; November 10, 1953 – November 12, 2026) and Brenda Evers Andrew (née Brenda Rose Evers; born December 16, 1963). Rob and Brenda Andrew were in the middle of divorce proceedings and Brenda had an affair with Pavatt, who helped to process an $800,000 life insurance policy on Rob, and the murder was carried out to obtain the insurance money.

Brenda and Pavatt fled to Mexico after the murder, but they were arrested and charged with murder. The pair were found guilty in separate trials between 2003 and 2004, and sentenced to death for killing Andrew, with Brenda still currently on death row. Pavatt was executed by lethal injection on November 12, 2026.

== Background ==
Rob Andrew, an advertising executive, and his wife Brenda Evers Andrew met during Brenda's senior year of high school. Brenda, born in 1963, was raised in Enid in a devout Lutheran household. She was described as a high-achieving, quiet, and traditionally conservative teenager who participated in church youth activities and a Christian evangelism program. Rob was a Baptist from a similarly religious family. They attended college, married in 1984, and settled in Oklahoma after spending some time in Texas. Rob became a successful advertising executive, earning a six-figure salary. Brenda graduated from college and worked in banking, a job she enjoyed. After the birth of their two children, a daughter and a son, in 1990 and 1994, respectively, Brenda became a stay-at-home mother.

The family's financial success allowed them to purchase a large home in the upscale Lansbrook neighborhood. Brenda became active in North Pointe Baptist Church, where she taught Sunday school despite her Lutheran upbringing. Behind this stable family life, however, the couple's marriage began to deteriorate. Brenda was unhappy after Rob insisted that they return to Oklahoma from Texas, and Rob sought marital counseling. By October 2001, the couple had separated, and Brenda filed for divorce. Around the same period, Brenda became increasingly close to James Dwight Pavatt, an insurance salesman and fellow Sunday school teacher at North Pointe Baptist Church, and began to have an affair with him. Pavatt was also Rob's friend and had sold him an $800,000 life-insurance policy. At the time they began the affair, Pavatt had just divorced his wife Suk Hui a month prior on September 6, 2001.

Apart from her affair with Pavatt, Brenda previously engaged in affairs with at least two more men, and during the few years leading up to her husband's murder, Brenda was often seen wearing skintight and provocative clothing whenever outdoors, even when she was at the church.

== Murder ==
During the final weeks leading up to the murder, Brenda Andrew and James Pavatt hatched a plot to kill Rob. The prosecution said the main motive was the $800,000 insurance policy that Pavatt made on Andrew's life, and the two decided to get the payout by killing Andrew. Pavatt told his daughter in late October 2001 that Brenda asked him to murder her husband. Two of Brenda's former lovers also stated that Brenda had confided in them her hatred for her husband, whom she wished was dead.

On October 26, 2001, Pavatt cut the brake lines of Andrew's automobile and as part of a plan to make Andrew die in an accident, he asked his daughter to contact Andrew with an untraceable phone, falsely informing him that Brenda was at a hospital in Norman, Oklahoma, and needed him immediately. An unknown male also made a similar call to Andrew, who went out to drive his car, but Andrew discovered that his car's brake lines were cut and therefore did not drive the car. Andrew notified the police regarding the matter, and also said he believed his wife and Pavatt likely engaged in a relationship. On November 2, 2001, Andrew, who began to suspect that his wife and Pavatt were conspiring to kill him for the insurance money, filed another police report and informed the police of his suspicions.

On November 20, 2001, Andrew returned to the family's matrimonial home to pick up the children over the Thanksgiving holiday, and during the visit, Brenda asked Andrew to help her relight the pilot light on a furnace in the garage. After luring Andrew to the garage, Pavatt and Brenda used a shotgun to shoot Andrew twice, killing him on the spot. Brenda also shot herself on the arm once, and later lied to the police that she and her husband were attacked by two masked gunmen in the garage, a story which was later doubted by the police investigators.

== Arrest ==
Six days after the murder, Brenda Andrew and the children obtained tourist visas to leave the country. James Pavatt received a permit to depart the country and drive his 1992 Chevrolet sedan into Mexico. Together, the couple escaped to Mexico on the same day, taking the children with them, and they did not attend the funeral of Rob Andrew. Documents retrieved by two news agencies in February 2002 also indicated that on the same day, someone attempted to use Pavatt's bank card to withdraw money from a cash machine in Nuevo Laredo, Mexico. These details gave rise to the authorities' suspicions that the couple was involved in Andrew's murder before they fled to Mexico.

An international manhunt was conducted to locate and capture the couple. The high-profile nature of the crime drew interest from multiple national television programs like The Early Show, 48 Hours, 20/20, Inside Edition, and America's Most Wanted, which all wanted to cover the case. Throughout the search, Pavatt's 26-year-old daughter helped the FBI to find her father, and she informed the FBI that she helped her father prepare to leave the country with Brenda. She also provided testimony that Pavatt was roped in by Brenda to murder her husband. Pavatt's daughter was given a mobile phone by FBI agents to contact her father, and prior to the couple's arrest, there were 15 to 25 phone calls made between Pavatt and his daughter.

On February 27, 2002, both Brenda and Pavatt were arrested in Hidalgo, Texas, while they were attempting to cross the border from Mexico into the United States. After being taken into custody in Texas, the couple waived extradition and agreed to return to Oklahoma to face charges. The children of Brenda and Andrew were also found safe and taken into protective custody by the FBI, before they reunited with their paternal grandparents.

On July 18, 2002, Oklahoma County District Attorney Wes Lane announced that he would seek the death penalty for both Brenda and Pavatt. On February 18, 2003, District Attorney Lane requested for the prosecution to try Pavatt before they proceeded with the trial of Brenda.

== Trials of Pavatt and Brenda ==
=== James Pavatt ===
2023 Mugshot of James Dwight Pavatt

On September 14, 2003, James Dwight Pavatt was found guilty of the first-degree murder of Rob Andrew by an Oklahoma County jury. On September 16, 2003, the jury unanimously decided to sentence Pavatt to death.

On October 21, 2003, District Judge Susan Bragg formally sentenced Pavatt to death, and set an execution date of January 12, 2004, although the execution would be postponed pending a mandatory appeal to the Oklahoma Court of Criminal Appeals. A month later, the Oklahoma Court of Criminal Appeals granted Pavatt an automatic stay of execution while they processed his direct appeal against the death sentence.

=== Brenda Andrew ===
2004 Mugshot of Brenda Andrew

On July 13, 2004, a second jury found Brenda Andrew guilty of the first-degree murder of her husband. On July 15, 2004, the jury unanimously voted to impose the death penalty for Brenda. It was reported that if she was given the death penalty, Brenda would become the only woman on Oklahoma's death row.

On September 22, 2004, Brenda was formally sentenced to death by District Judge Susan Bragg, who set an execution date of December 10, 2004, although the execution would be stayed while Brenda's sentence was reviewed by the higher courts. Brenda addressed the court during sentencing, stating that the verdict of death was an "egregious miscarriage of justice", and insisted she was innocent and she never killed her husband.

== Appeals of Pavatt ==
Following his trial, James Pavatt was incarcerated on death row at the Oklahoma State Penitentiary.

In his plea for clemency on October 14, 2026, Pavatt told members of the Oklahoma Pardon and Parole Board, "I cannot speak for Brenda. I cannot explain her actions, but I speak for myself. I am not guilty of Rob's murder, and I am not guilty for shooting Brenda."

Clemency was denied by the Oklahoma Pardon and Parole Board in a 3–2 vote.

On May 8, 2007, Pavatt lost his appeal to the Oklahoma Court of Criminal Appeals. On April 12, 2008, the Oklahoma Court of Criminal Appeals dismissed Pavatt's appeal against his death sentence.

On June 24, 2017, in a 2–1 ruling, the 10th U.S. Circuit Court of Appeals overturned Pavatt's death sentence after finding that there was insufficient evidence to prove that the murder of Andrew was "especially heinous, atrocious or cruel", an aggravating factor relied on by the prosecution in seeking the death penalty for Pavatt back in his original trial.

On June 27, 2019, after a second review of Pavatt's case, the full 10th U.S. Circuit Court of Appeals reinstated Pavatt's death sentence by a 10–3 majority ruling.

On January 28, 2020, Pavatt lost his final appeal to the U.S. Supreme Court, and therefore became eligible to be executed on a date to be decided. By February 2020, Pavatt was one of 26 condemned prisoners from Oklahoma eligible for a death warrant.

Subsequently, Pavatt and 27 other condemned inmates from Oklahoma filed a joint lawsuit seeking to challenge the constitutionality of the state's lethal injection protocols. In June 2022, a federal court rejected the lawsuit and upheld the constitutionality of the three-drug lethal-injection protocol in Oklahoma.

== Execution of Pavatt ==
In June 2022, two years after losing his final appeal, Oklahoma Attorney General John M. O'Connor filed a petition seeking execution dates for James Pavatt and 24 other death-row prisoners. He also requested that the executions be carried out at four-week intervals.

In August 2022, Pavatt was one of 25 death row inmates from Oklahoma to have their sentences scheduled for the next two years. Pavatt's tentative execution date was set for July 11, 2024. However, in May 2024, the Oklahoma Court of Criminal Appeals ruled that the state shall carry out their future executions in every 90 days, extending the interval from its previous setting of 60 days. This ruling, in return, granted Pavatt a stay of execution and postponed his original date of execution.

After the execution of Carlos Cuesta-Rodriguez on August 13, 2026, Oklahoma Attorney General Gentner Drummond requested that the Oklahoma Court of Criminal Appeals set an execution date for James Pavatt.

On August 27, 2026, the Oklahoma Court of Criminal Appeals scheduled Pavatt's execution to be carried out by lethal injection on November 12, 2026, at the Oklahoma State Penitentiary.

On October 14, 2026, after a brief hearing, the Oklahoma Pardon and Parole Board voted 3–2 to deny clemency for Pavatt. Under Oklahoma state law, since the board did not recommend clemency for Pavatt, Governor Kevin Stitt would not be able to commute Pavatt's sentence to life imprisonment without the possibility of parole.

On November 12, 2026, two days after his 73rd birthday, James Dwight Pavatt was put to death by lethal injection at the Oklahoma State Penitentiary. He was pronounced dead at 10:12 am. Pavatt did not make an official final statement before his execution, but apparently conversed with his spiritual advisor before the procedure began. His last meal consisted of a three-meat barbecue dinner and a strawberry milkshake.

== Appeals of Brenda ==
After her sentencing, Brenda Andrew was transferred to Mabel Bassett Correctional Center, where she was detained as the lone woman on Oklahoma's death row. Throughout the history of Oklahoma, it was extremely rare for women to be sentenced to death, and between 1915 and 2001, only four women were executed in the state, including three in 2001. The most recent execution of a woman in Oklahoma was that of Lois Nadean Smith, who was found guilty of torturing and murdering her son's ex-girlfriend Cindy Bailee and executed in December 2001.

Throughout the appeal process, the center of Brenda's appeal was that the prosecutors in her original trial had submitted irrelevant evidence regarding Brenda's sexual infidelity throughout her marriage, and portrayed her as a promiscuous woman who had failings as a wife and mother. At one point, one of the prosecutors allegedly called Brenda a "slut puppy" and at another point, her lacy underwear was shown to jurors to support their arguments. The defense contended that the prosecutors unfairly used sexually charged and irrelevant evidence about Brenda's private life to persuade the jury, potentially making her murder trial constitutionally unfair.

On June 21, 2007, Brenda's appeal was dismissed by the Oklahoma Court of Criminal Appeals. On September 9, 2015, Brenda lost her appeal to the U.S. District Court for the Western District of Oklahoma. On March 22, 2023, by a vote of 2–1, Brenda's appeal was rejected by the 10th U.S. Circuit Court of Appeals.

In March 2024, Brenda appealed to the U.S. Supreme Court, seeking post-conviction relief on the basis that the prosecution had violated her rights to a fair trial with the sexist stereotyping allegations they presented in her trial.

On January 22, 2025, the U.S. Supreme Court granted Brenda her appeal and remanded the case to the 10th U.S. Circuit Court of Appeals for a re-hearing, to allow her to pursue her claims of having her rights to a fair trial violated due to the prosecution's alleged misconduct.

On January 13, 2026, the 10th U.S. Circuit Court of Appeals denied Brenda's appeal and upheld her death sentence and murder conviction. They stated that there was evidence to prove Brenda's guilt, including her decision to fake her gunshot injury, disguise Andrew's death as a robbery-murder, and flee to Mexico, and the $800,000 insurance policy she made on her husband's life, and even though some of the evidence regarding her sex life was improper, it would not have influenced the jury in finding her guilty. The 10th Circuit denied Brenda an en banc rehearing on August 14, 2026, after which Brenda and her counsel announced their intent to appeal to the Supreme Court.

== Aftermath ==
In the aftermath, while both James Pavatt and Brenda Andrew remained at large for the murder of Rob Andrew, the parents of both Andrew and Brenda sought to assume custody of their two grandchildren in December 2001. In June 2002, Andrew's parents were granted temporary custody of their grandchildren, and in April 2003, Associate District Judge Richard M. Perry ordered that Andrew's parents should assume permanent guardianship of their two grandchildren, and also allowed Brenda's relatives to make unsupervised visits to the children regularly. The children were also allowed to visit their mother in prison with their maternal relatives.

As for Andrew's $800,000 life insurance policy, the payout was put on hold while the trials of both Brenda and Pavatt were ongoing, and after the jury sentenced Brenda to death in July 2004, the payout was expected to be issued to the children. In December 2004, a federal judge ruled that the insurance payout, amounting to $831,272 plus interest, should be granted to the children as a trust fund for them, and Andrew's three brothers were designated as the trustees of the fund.

Five years after the murder of Rob Andrew, the tenth season of Forensic Files re-enacted the crime and aired it on January 11, 2006.

In April 2012, true crime show Scorned: Love Kills re-enacted the murder of Rob Andrew and aired it on the Investigation Discovery Channel.

In January 2020, the Rob Andrew case was featured in the tenth episode of People Magazine Investigates season 4.

== See also ==
- Capital punishment in Oklahoma
- List of death row inmates in the United States § Oklahoma
- List of women on death row in the United States § Oklahoma
- List of people executed in the United States in 2026
