= ESG Solutions =

Geophysical products and services company

- Type: Private
- Industry: Oil services, Mine services
- Founded: 1993
- Headquarters: Kingston, Ontario, Canada
- Area served: Global
- Key people: David Moore (CEO); Trevor Pugh (CTO)
- Products: Microseismic instrumentation and Geophysical services
- Website: www.esgsolutions.com

ESG Solutions (Engineering Seismology Group or ESG) is a geophysical products and services company specializing in microseismic monitoring. ESG manufactures and installs microseismic instrumentation and performs microseismic data processing and interpretation services. It is headquartered in Kingston, Ontario, Canada, with operations in Calgary, Houston, and Beijing and offices in Brisbane, Surabaya and Dallas. The company was purchased by Deep Imaging in May 2021. Prior to this the company was purchased by FTSE 250 Index constituent, Spectris, in December 2014.

== Microseismic monitoring ==
ESG Solutions was founded in 1993 as Engineering Seismology Group Inc. The company performs microseismic monitoring services for the oil and gas, mining and geotechnical industries, but its roots lie in microseismic monitoring for the Canadian mining industry. The group was loosely formed out of the Engineering Seismology Lab at Queen’s University in Kingston, Ontario, Canada that was performing research on a form of seismology called microseisms, or 'passive seismic'.

=== History ===
Microseismic science is the study of very small scale earthquakes that are induced by industrial processes such as mining or oil production. In the 1980s, many mines in northern Ontario were experiencing increased seismic activity, including a large rockburst which killed 4 miners in Sudbury in 1984. In response to this accident, a consortium of mining companies was established with government support to develop monitoring systems to acquire seismic waveforms and to study the causes and mechanisms of rockbursts. The research lab led by Professor R. Paul Young at Queen’s University set out to develop instrumentation, software and processing routines to locate the source of microseismic activity in mines, and when the lab disbanded in the early 1990s, ESG’s founders continued this work in a commercial capacity. In December 2014, Spectris plc acquired ESG Solutions. In May 2021, Deep Imaging acquired ESG Solutions.

==== Retsof Salt Mine, New York ====
ESG's first permanent seismic system installation took place at the Retsof Salt Mine in the Genesee Valley near Retsof, New York. In 1994, the Retsof Salt Mine was the largest salt mine in North America, and the second largest in the world. Mining activities had caused the collapse of a 500 by 500 foot piece of the mine ceiling at a depth of 1,200 feet below the surface. The collapse of the shale ceiling rock compromised the caprock layer separating the mine from overlying ground water, and the mine began to flood. The failure caused a magnitude 3.6 earthquake that was felt on the surface, as well as release of natural gases, declining aquifer levels and surface subsidence. An ESG seismic system was installed using boreholes and surface-based sensors to evaluate the integrity of the mine as it flooded and track the sinkhole generated at the surface.

==== Cotton Valley Consortium ====
ESG began applying the knowledge gained from work in the mining industry to the oil and gas sector. ESG monitored well stimulations using microseismic instrumentation to define event locations and source mechanisms and analyzed microseismicity associated with compaction in the North Sea Ekofisk and Valhall fields. In 1997, ESG pioneered the use of microseismic analysis in shale gas extraction by providing geometric and fracture growth characteristics for hydraulic fracture stimulations in the Cotton Valley fields in East Texas for Union Pacific Resources (UPR), a member of the Cotton Valley Hydraulic Fracture Imaging Consortium Project. The Cotton Valley Hydraulic Fracture Project was initiated in order to determine if microseismicity can be used to accurately map fracture geometry and depict hydraulic fracture growth, and be further employed to improve fracture design (fracture models), optimize the number and location of wells (reservoir drainage), and improve on-site production methodologies. Through this work with UPR and the Cotton Valley Consortium, ESG developed its Fracmap service; the petroleum industry’s first viable commercial hydraulic fracture imaging and interpretation service in January 2000.

==== EOR in Alberta's Oil Sands ====
Since 2002, ESG has been active in monitoring EOR activities in the heavy oil sands of Western Canada. Microseismic monitoring has proven to be a valuable resource to map steam movement during CSS and SAGD operations, as well as ensuring environmental compliance by mapping containment, caprock integrity and well casing failures.

=== More Recent Work ===
In recent years, ESG has been active in providing microseismic monitoring services for hydraulic fracture stimulations throughout North America, including in the Horn River Basin and the Marcellus shale, long-term reservoir monitoring of thermal steam injection operations, permanent monitoring of underground and open-pit mining operations, and CO_{2} sequestration and gas storage projects.

The company has placed an emphasis on furthering advanced microseismic analysis techniques including seismic moment tensor inversion (SMTI) analysis within the hydraulic fracture market. SMTI evaluates the failure mechanisms of the rock as fractures develop and is used to calculate stimulated reservoir volume (SRV), fracture intensity and complexity and develop discrete fracture networks (DFN).

In 2011, ESG re-entered the realm of wireline microseismic acquisition with the purchase a fleet of trucks and wireline tools to serve the US and Canadian markets. ESG successfully launched its wireline monitoring services by monitoring a 10-stage horizontal hydraulic fracture operation in the southern US, providing around-the-clock microseismic monitoring from three vertical observation wells. Since then, ESG has offered complete microseismic monitoring solutions for hydraulic fracture operations throughout the US and Western Canada.

In 2012, ESG launched a number of new products and services including the Paladin IV microseismic recorder and Mining and Geotechnical Consulting Services.

== See also ==
- List of oilfield service companies
