= Murder of Jesse Valencia =

2004 murder in Columbia, Missouri

- Location: Columbia, Missouri, United States
- Date: June 5, 2004; 22 years ago
- Weapon: Knife
- Deaths: 1
- Victim: Jesse Valencia
- Perpetrator: Steven Arthur Rios
- Verdict: Guilty
- Convictions: second-degree murder and armed criminal action

The murder of Jesse Valencia occurred on June 5, 2004, at the campus of the University of Missouri in Columbia, US. Columbia police officer, Steven Rios, was convicted of Valencia's murder in September 2004.

== Victim ==
Jesse James Wade Valencia
- Born: February 22, 1981; Boyle County, Kentucky, US
- Died: June 5, 2004 (aged 23); Columbia, Boone County, Missouri, US
- Occupation: College student

Jesse James Wade Valencia (February 22, 1981 – June 5, 2004) was born in Boyle County, Kentucky. He was one of three children, having two sisters. After high school, Valencia worked as a model.

At the time of his death, Valencia was a 23-year-old junior at the University of Missouri in Columbia, Boone County, Missouri. While at the university, Valencia studied pre-law and journalism; he also worked at the Campus Inn Motel.

Valencia is buried on the family farm in Perryville, Kentucky.

== Perpetrator ==
Steven Arthur Rios
- Born: 1977 (age 48–49)

Steven Arthur Rios (born 1977), a Columbia police officer regarded well by his division and with a wife and newborn baby at the time of the murder, was convicted of Valencia's murder in September 2004. Rios was sentenced to life imprisonment without parole for the murder and to a consecutive ten-year sentence for a related charge (for use of a weapon during commission of the crime). His conviction was later overturned after a judge ruled hearsay was admitted into evidence during his first trial. A retrial led to Rios' conviction of second-degree murder and armed criminal action, resulting in another life imprisonment and an additional twenty-three-year sentence.

== Background ==
Valencia was openly gay at his college, which was supported by the people he loved, and he would date and have casual intimate relationships during his time in college. Rios was called to break up a party two months before Valencia's murder. Valencia was attending and opposed the raid, so Rios arrested him. After asking numerous personal questions of Valencia on the drive down to the station, Rios visited Valencia the next day and they subsequently began having sex.

Rios would continually arrive unannounced at Valencia's living space without warning, where sexual exchanges would occur before Rios slipped away each time. One of Valencia's casual partners, Andy Schermerhorn, was present during one of the visits and coerced into participating in the sexual activities, with Valencia swearing him to silence. Valencia spoke with his mother, Linda, about the extortion and described it as "stalking", yet he knew little to nothing about Rios, possibly including his name. As the charges weren't dropped, Valencia was ready to report Rios to his department, which he told his friend Joan Sheridan.

== Murder ==
Valencia left his shift at the motel, then made his way to a campus party. He drank at the party and was making his way back on foot, having called one of his partners on the night in question. Valencia was found dead between two campus buildings by a group of students during the morning, estimated to have been killed some time shortly before dawn. His throat was slashed with a serrated knife, deep enough to scrape his spine. He had no defensive wounds, but strangulation marks on his throat revealed he was choked before he was slashed. Rios was one of the first officers to identify Valencia after he died.

== Legal developments ==
Schermerhorn reported to the police Valencia's arrangements with Rios, but only knew he was a cop. Despite the surprise of the department, Schermerhorn was brought in to look through department yearbook photos for identification. When Schermerhorn passed Rios when he was being brought to the room he was being walked to, he told the officers once he got inside that Rios was the man he saw with Valencia and had the two men engage in sexual acts with him.

Rios fully denied the murder, but he conceded that he and Valencia had sexual liaisons when Schermerhorn was brought up as a witness. Giving a DNA sample, Rios' DNA was found under Valencia's nails, but he was released since this didn't tie him to the murder and the liaisons weren't matched to any legal statutes to charge by. Rios had called his captain, Zim Schwartze, implying guilt over some bad action, and he even said he'd purchased a shotgun and was intent on suicide. The captain had Rios under an emergency psychiatric commitment for his own safety. Rios escaped and again threatened suicide by jumping off a parking garage, but he was detained and institutionalized again.

The coroner took a second look at Valencia, finding bruising on his chest and back. Police agreed it was by a specialized chokehold technique, but Valencia was bruised more because he fought back. Because Rios failed defensive training, which would explain the poorly executed chokehold, and Rios' arm hairs were on Valencia's chest when they were pulled out in self-defense, Rios was arrested and charged with Valencia's murder.

The prosecution argued Valencia demanded the affair end during his next meeting with Rios, as he found out he had a family of his own. Rios was enraged, chased Valencia outside, and killed him in the manners identified. Later reports also revealed Rios propositioned other people, specifically women, for sexual favors after they were arrested. Rios' defense tried to cast doubt by describing Valencia's personality as unreliable and arguing Valencia's numerous partners accounted for Rios not being responsible. Rios was still convicted, first of murder in the first, then murder in the second in a retrial, and remains in prison as of 2022.

== Media ==
The murder was featured on several television programs.

Date	Series	Episode
December 14, 2005	Forensic Files	"Cop Out"
September 8, 2013	Deadline: Crime with Tamron Hall	"A Secret Affair"
January 15, 2016	Forbidden: Dying for Love	"An Affair to Forget"
January 22, 2017	Killer Cops	"Steven Rios"
September 14, 2018	In Plain Sight	"Killer Hookup"
December 12, 2019	An Unexpected Killer	"Dying to See You"
April 24, 2020	Dateline NBC	"Before Daylight"
August 30, 2021	A Time to Kill	"Admit the Affair, Deny the Murder"
January 12, 2023	How I Caught My Killer	"Everybody was always looking at him"
December 22, 2025	Mr. Ballen Podcast	"Looking For Love"
March 9, 2026	Morbidology Podcast	"351: Jesse Valencia"

== See also ==
- Crime in Missouri
