= Trey Gowdy =

American news anchor and politician (born 1964)

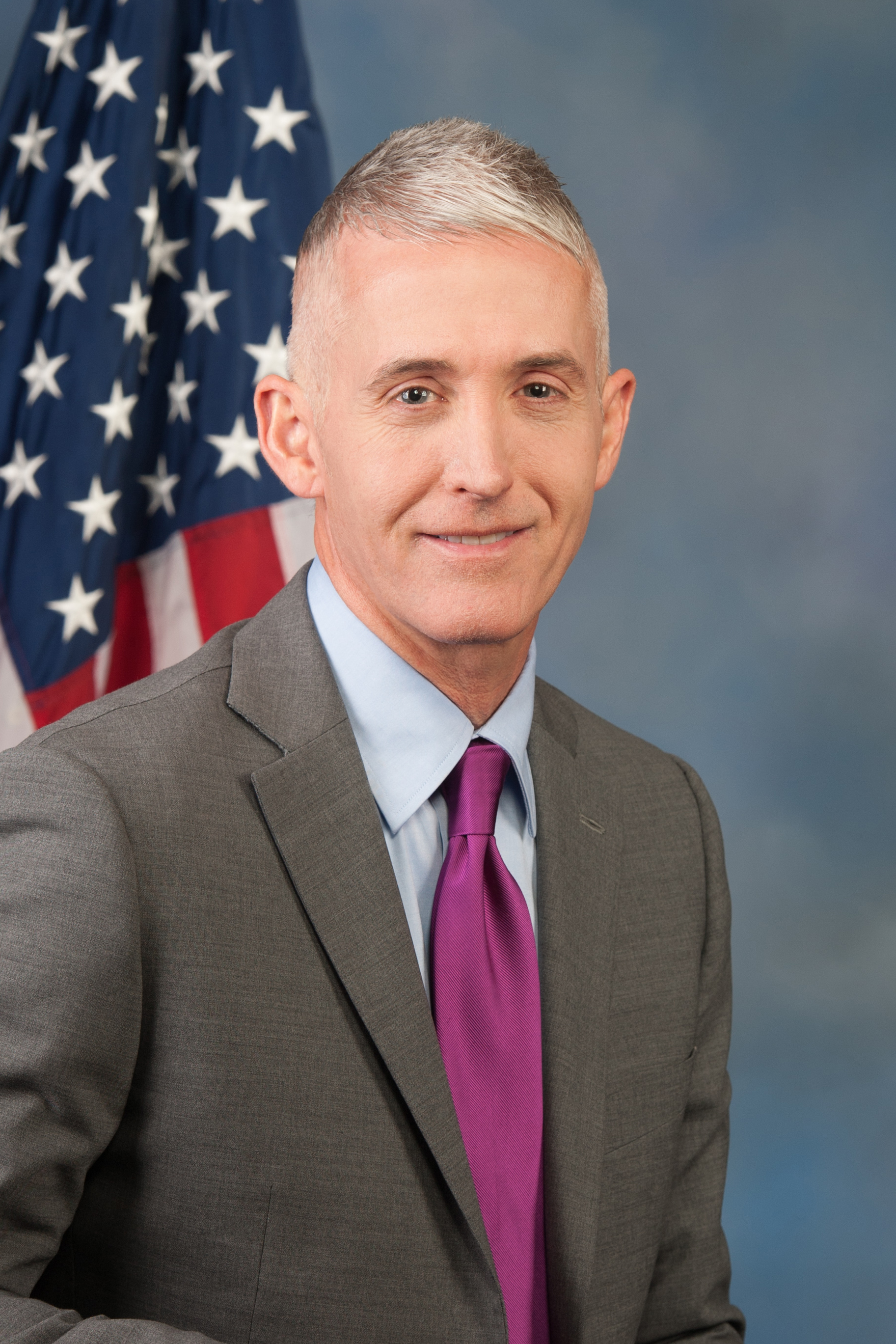
- Official portrait, 2016

Chair of the House Oversight Committee
- In office June 13, 2017 – January 3, 2019
- Preceded by: Jason Chaffetz
- Succeeded by: Elijah Cummings

Chair of the House Benghazi Committee
- In office May 8, 2014 – July 8, 2016
- Preceded by: Position established
- Succeeded by: Position abolished

Member of the U.S. House of Representatives from South Carolina's 4th district
- In office January 3, 2011 – January 3, 2019
- Preceded by: Bob Inglis
- Succeeded by: William Timmons

Personal details
- Born: Harold Watson Gowdy III; August 22, 1964 (age 62) Greenville, South Carolina, U.S.
- Party: Republican
- Spouse: Terri Dillard (m. 1989)
- Children: 2
- Education: Baylor University (BA); University of South Carolina (JD)
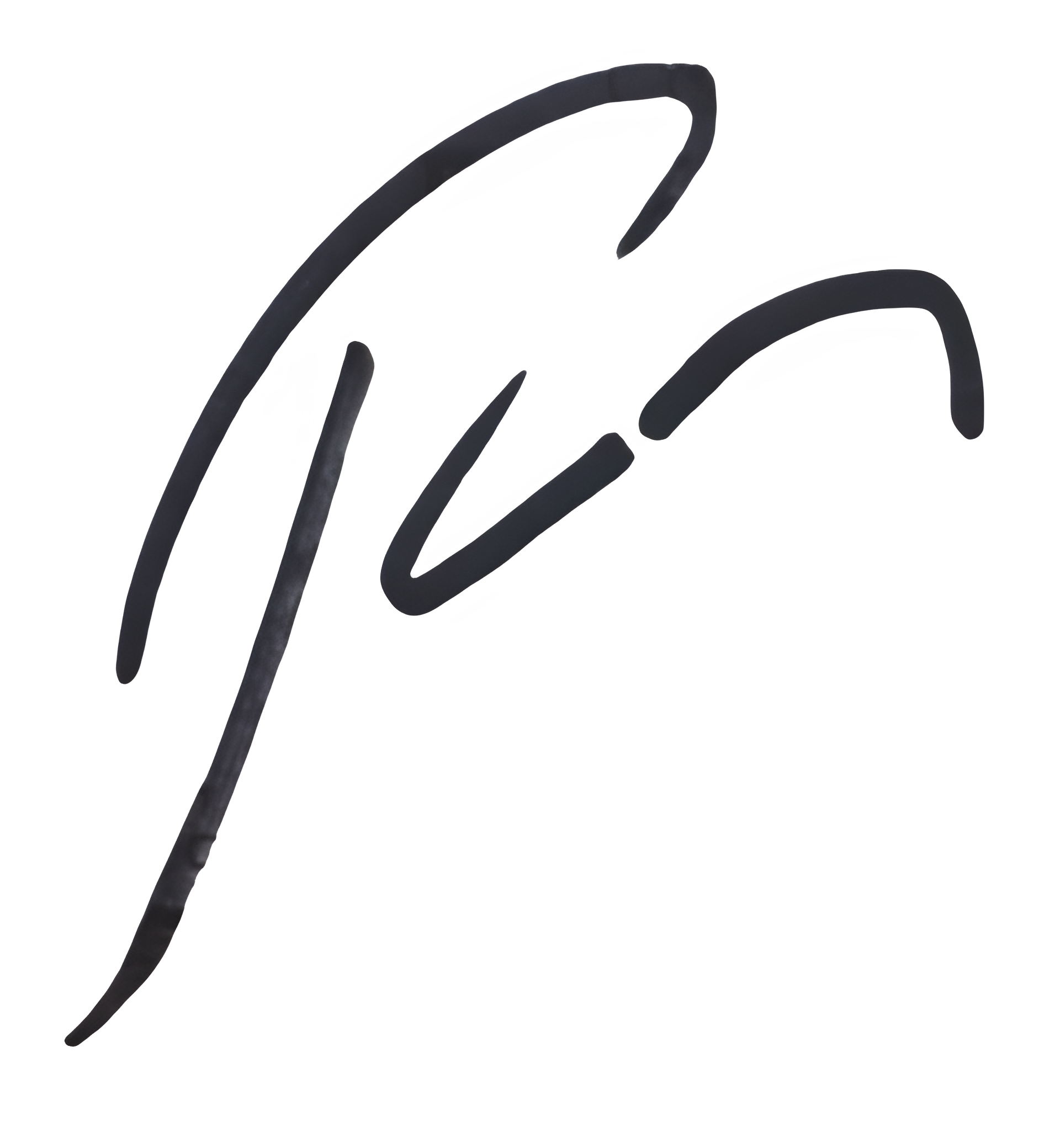
- Signature
- Website: Professional website
- Gowdy's voice Gowdy opening a House Oversight Committee hearing on election cybersecurity. Recorded July 24, 2018

Harold Watson "Trey" Gowdy III (born August 22, 1964) is an American television news presenter, former politician and former federal prosecutor who served as the U.S. representative for South Carolina's 4th congressional district from 2011 to 2019. His district included much of the Upstate region of South Carolina, including Greenville and Spartanburg.

Before his congressional career, Gowdy served as a federal prosecutor in the District of South Carolina from 1994 to 2000 and then as the solicitor (district attorney) for South Carolina's Seventh Judicial Circuit, comprising Spartanburg and Cherokee counties from 2000 to 2010. He appeared in four episodes of Forensic Files as the prosecutor of four of the highlighted cases he won. From 2014 to 2016, Gowdy chaired the United States House Select Committee on Benghazi which was partly responsible for discovering the existence of Hillary Clinton's private email server. His investigative committee spent over two-and-a-half years and $7.8 million investigating the events surrounding the 2012 Benghazi attack, Gowdy pressed for the prosecution of Hillary Clinton during the 2016 presidential campaign. Beginning in June 2017 he chaired the House Oversight Committee.

On January 31, 2018, Gowdy announced that he would not seek re-election in 2018 and that he intended to pursue a legal career instead of politics. He has since rejoined the law firm Nelson Mullins Riley & Scarborough, and also joined Fox News as a contributor. In early 2021, he served as an interim host of Fox News Primetime, and then was named host of Sunday Night in America with Trey Gowdy later that same year. In May 2023, Gowdy served as a guest host of Fox News Tonight following the firing of Tucker Carlson.

== Early life and education ==
Gowdy was born on August 22, 1964, in Greenville, South Carolina. He is the son of Novalene (Evans) and Harold Watson "Hal" Gowdy Jr., MD. He grew up in Spartanburg, where as a young man he delivered newspapers for the local daily and worked at the community market. Gowdy graduated from Spartanburg High School in 1982 and earned a Bachelor of Arts degree in history from Baylor University in 1986. While at Baylor he was a member of Kappa Omega Tau. He graduated Juris Doctor from the University of South Carolina School of Law in 1989.

== Legal career ==
Gowdy worked as judicial law clerk for John P. Gardner on the South Carolina Court of Appeals as well as for federal judge G. Ross Anderson of the United States District Court for the District of South Carolina. He then went into private practice at Nelson, Mullins, Riley & Scarborough in Greenville, South Carolina, before being appointed as an assistant United States Attorney in April 1994. Gowdy received the Postal Inspector's Award for the successful prosecution of J. Mark Allen, one of "America's Most Wanted" suspects.

In February 2000, he left the United States Attorney's Office to run for 7th Circuit solicitor. He defeated incumbent Solicitor Holman Gossett, in the Republican primary, and then ran unopposed in the general election. Gowdy was re-elected in 2004 and 2008, both times unopposed. During his tenure he appeared in four episodes of the television program Forensic Files (series 12, ep 24, s13 ep 9, 20, s14, ep 19) as well as Dateline NBC and SCETV. He prosecuted the set of criminal cases and seven of them were death penalty cases.

== U.S. House of Representatives ==
=== Elections ===
==== 2010 ====
In the summer of 2009, Gowdy announced that he would challenge incumbent Republican U.S. Congressman Bob Inglis in the Republican primary for South Carolina's 4th congressional district.

Despite getting a 93% lifetime rating from the American Conservative Union, Inglis had angered the conservative wing of the Republican Party by taking stances that were perceived to be more moderate than those he had taken when he first represented the district from 1993 to 1999; besides opposing elements in his own party on issues including climate change, he attracted attention as a member of the Judiciary Committee for providing the deciding vote that prevented a measure designed to protect the phrase "under God" in the Pledge of Allegiance from coming to the House floor. Gowdy was one of several candidates in the 2010 primary who ran well to Inglis' right. Inglis had drawn five Republican challengers, including Gowdy. In the June 2010 primary, Gowdy ranked first with 39% of the vote, short of the 50% majority threshold to win outright and avoid a run-off. Inglis received 27% of the vote. Jim Lee got 14%, State Senator David L. Thomas got 13%, and former Historian of the United States House of Representatives Christina Jeffrey was last with 7% of the vote.

In the run-off election, Gowdy defeated Inglis 70–30%. The 4th district was considered so heavily Republican that it was widely presumed Gowdy had clinched a seat in Congress with his primary victory. Gowdy defeated Democratic nominee Paul Corden 63–29%.

==== 2012 ====
Gowdy ran for re-election to a second term against Democrat Deb Morrow. During redistricting following the 2010 census, one proposed map saw large portions of Spartanburg County, Gowdy's home county, cut out of the district, while leaving all of Greenville County within the district. Gowdy was initially quoted as being "disappointed" with the version, even though the redrawn 4th would have been as solidly Republican as its predecessor. The final map moved a portion of Greenville County to the 3rd district while leaving almost all of Spartanburg County in the 4th district (except for a sliver that was moved to the 5th district). Gowdy was quoted as being "pleased" with this version, since Greenville and Spartanburg counties remained linked. Roll Call rated his district as "Safe Republican" in 2012. Gowdy easily secured a second term, defeating Morrow 65–34%.

==== 2014 ====
Gowdy ran for re-election again in 2014. His only opponent was Libertarian Curtis E. McLaughlin. He was reelected with 85% of the popular vote.

==== 2016 ====
In the November 2016 election, Gowdy faced Democrat Chris Fedalei, a 26-year-old attorney. He defeated Fedalei with 67% of the vote to retain his seat.

=== Tenure ===
According to Politico during his tenure in Congress, Gowdy was "considered one of the GOP's most versatile and skilled legal experts, owing to his background as a federal prosecutor". While chairing the House Oversight Committee Gowdy tackled high-profile investigations. Democrats criticized Gowdy for conducting his investigations in a partisan fashion. After Trump became president, Gowdy defended the FBI and Special Counsel Robert Mueller's investigation into Russian interference in the 2016 election to the dismay of Trump supporters. However, in a June 2018 hearing, Gowdy urged Deputy Attorney General Rod Rosenstein to wrap up the special counsel investigation. Rosenstein rejected the suggestion, saying the special counsel investigation should finish "appropriately". Democrats criticized Gowdy for not fully pursuing investigations into potential conflicts of interest in the Trump White House or investigating the White House security clearance process.

In August 2011, during the 2011 United States debt ceiling crisis, Gowdy opposed Speaker John Boehner's debt limit bill, and he voted against the final debt ceiling agreement. He also opposed the 2011 defense authorization bill, citing concerns about the prospect of Americans being detained without trial on national security grounds. In December 2010, he told Congressional Quarterly that he would support a measure only if its sponsor could demonstrate that the Constitution gave the government the power to act in a particular realm.

Gowdy worked on the Committee on the Judiciary, the Committee on Oversight and Government Reform, and the Committee on Education and the Workforce. Gowdy frequently spoke on the floor of the House on issues ranging from Operation Fast and Furious to his support for reauthorization of the Violence Against Women Act.

In 2012, he received the Defender of Economic Freedom award from the fiscally conservative 501(c)4 organization Club for Growth. The award is given to members of Congress who have the year's highest ranking, according to the Club for Growth's metrics. Gowdy scored 97 out of 100, and was one of 34 congressmen given the award.

An ardent social conservative, Gowdy considers himself "pro-life plus". He not only believes "in the sanctity of life", but argued that "the strategy should be broader than waiting for the Supreme Court to revisit Roe v. Wade."

Gowdy signed the Contract from America, which aims to defund, repeal, and replace the Patient Protection and Affordable Care Act, limit United States Environmental Protection Agency regulations, enact a reform of the federal tax code, pass a balanced budget amendment, and end earmarks.

In May 2018, Gowdy challenged President Trump's accusation saying that the FBI had spied on his 2016 presidential campaign. As a result Gowdy was attacked by various Trump allies; Politico reported that Gowdy was "virtually alone, getting little support from his House colleagues". In June 2018, Speaker Paul Ryan came out in support of Gowdy, saying that Gowdy's assessment was "accurate".

At a July 2018 congressional hearing, Gowdy suggested there was impropriety on behalf of FBI agent Peter Strzok and said that Strzok had shown bias in favor of Hillary Clinton and against Donald Trump during the 2016 presidential election. He said that this had shaped Strzok's work for the FBI. During the hearing Gowdy repeatedly pressed Strzok about a text message saying Strzok said "we'll stop Trump". Strzok said that a "We'll stop Trump" text message was written late at night and off-the-cuff shortly after controversial remarks were made by Trump towards the family of an American war veteran, and that the message reflected Strzok's belief that Americans would not vote for a candidate who engaged in such "horrible, disgusting behavior". Strzok said the message "was in no way—unequivocally—any suggestion that me, the FBI, would take any action whatsoever to improperly impact the electoral process for any candidate." He added that he knew of information during the 2016 presidential campaign that could have damaged Trump but that he never contemplated leaking it. Strzok said that the investigation into him and the Republicans' related rhetoric was misguided and played into "our enemies' campaign to tear America apart."

=== Legislation ===
On March 4, 2014, Gowdy introduced the ENFORCE the Law Act of 2014 into the House. The bill would give the United States House of Representatives and the United States Senate the ability to sue the President of the United States in a federal district court to clarify a federal law (that is, seek a declaratory judgment) in the event that the executive branch is not enforcing the law. House Republicans argued that the bill was necessary because the Obama Administration refused to enforce the laws. H.R. 4138 passed the House but failed to become law.

=== Committee assignments ===
- Committee on the Judiciary
  - Subcommittee on Constitution and Civil Justice
  - Subcommittee on Crime, Terrorism, Homeland Security and Investigations (Chairman)
- Committee on Oversight and Government Reform (Chairman)
  - Subcommittee on Health Care, Benefits and Administrative Rules
  - Subcommittee on Intergovernmental Affairs
- Permanent Select Committee on Intelligence

=== Caucus memberships ===
- Republican Study Committee

== Presidential politics ==
In July 2016, Republican nominee Donald Trump named Gowdy as a possible nominee for United States Attorney General in a Trump cabinet. In late December 2015, Gowdy endorsed Senator Marco Rubio for president, praising him as a rarity among elected officials for having kept his campaign promises. Gowdy's endorsement strained his relations with Donald Trump's campaign; Trump said that Gowdy had "failed miserably on Benghazi". Rubio withdrew from the race in March 2016, after losing his home state of Florida to Trump. Two months later, on May 20, Gowdy endorsed Trump for president, admitting that while he was a "Rubio guy" he would support the presumptive Republican nominee. After the May 2017 dismissal of FBI Director Comey, Gowdy was being considered for his replacement. However, the veteran representative told Attorney General Sessions that he wanted to remain in his congressional seat.

On December 1, 2017, the Congressional Office of Compliance said that while Gowdy was acting as chairman of the House Select Committee on Benghazi, a former congressional aide of his reached a settlement with Congress and the House Employment Counsel. The aide had alleged he was fired in part because he was not willing to focus his investigative work on Hillary Clinton (a charge which was later dropped) and because he was absent from the position while fulfilling an Air Force Reserve assignment. His attorney stated: "I can confirm that my client is one person who brought a veterans status discrimination and retaliation suit against Congress and that the case settled on terms that were satisfactory to my client." The Washington Post reported that Gowdy was responsible for use of tax-payer funds to pay the claim against the government.

== Resumption of legal career ==
After leaving Congress, Gowdy rejoined the law firm Nelson Mullins Riley & Scarborough. He represented sports executive Tim Leiweke who faced charges from the Justice Department for violating antitrust laws. Gowdy persuaded President Donald Trump to pardon Leiweke on December 2, 2025.

== Personal life ==
Gowdy married Terri (née Dillard) in 1989. She is a former Miss Spartanburg and once a second runner-up for Miss South Carolina. The couple have two children, Watson and Abigail. As of January 2019, she was a first-grade teacher in the Spartanburg School District.

== Electoral history ==
South Carolina's 4th congressional district primary, 2010
Party	Candidate	Votes	%
Republican	Trey Gowdy	34,103	39.22
Republican	Bob Inglis (incumbent)	23,877	27.46
Republican	Jim Lee	11,854	13.63
Republican	David L. Thomas	11,073	12.74
Republican	Christina Fawcett Jeffrey	6,041	6.95
Total votes		86,948	100.00

South Carolina's 4th congressional district primary runoff, 2010
Party	Candidate	Votes	%
Republican	Trey Gowdy	51,541	70.18
Republican	Bob Inglis (incumbent)	21,898	29.82
Total votes		73,439	100.00

South Carolina's 4th congressional district election, 2010
Party	Candidate	Votes	%
Republican	Trey Gowdy	137,586	63.45
Democratic	Paul Corden	62,438	28.79
Constitution	Dave Edwards	11,059	5.10
Libertarian	Rick Mahler	3,010	1.39
Green	Faye Walters	2,564	1.18
Write-ins		181	0.08
Total votes		216,838	100.00
Republican hold			

South Carolina 4th congressional district election, 2012
Party	Candidate	Votes	%
Republican	Trey Gowdy (Incumbent)	173,201	64.90
Democratic	Deb Morrow	89,964	33.71
Green	Jeff Sumerel	3,390	1.27
Write-In	Candidates	329	0.12
Total votes		266,884	100.00

South Carolina 4th congressional district election, 2014
Party	Candidate	Votes	%
Republican	Trey Gowdy (Incumbent)	126,452	84.84
Libertarian	Curtis E. McLaughlin Jr.	21,969	14.74
Write-Ins		628	0.42
Total votes		149,049	100.00
Republican hold			

South Carolina 4th congressional district election, 2016
Party	Candidate	Votes	%
Republican	Trey Gowdy (Incumbent)	198,648	67.19
Democratic	Chris Fedalei	91,676	31.01
Constitution	Michael Chandler	5,103	1.73
Write-Ins		243	0.08
Total votes		295,670	100.00
Republican hold			

U.S. House of Representatives
Preceded by Bob Inglis	Member of the U.S. House of Representatives from South Carolina's 4th congressional district 2011–2019	Succeeded by William Timmons
New office	Chair of the House Benghazi Committee; 2014–2016	Position abolished
Preceded by Jason Chaffetz	Chair of the House Oversight Committee; 2017–2019	Succeeded by Elijah Cummings
U.S. order of precedence (ceremonial)
Preceded by Gresham Barrett as Former U.S. Representative	Order of precedence of the United States as Former U.S. Representative	Succeeded by Carol Shea-Porter as Former U.S. Representative
