= Forensic Files season 13 =

Forensic Files
- Season 13

Release
- Original network: truTV
- Original release: September 12, 2008 – July 9, 2010

Season chronology
- ← Previous; Season 12 Next → Season 14

Forensic Files is an American documentary-style series which reveals how forensic science is used to solve violent crimes, mysterious accidents, and outbreaks of illness. The show is broadcast on truTV, narrated by Peter Thomas, and produced by Medstar Television, in association with truTV Original Productions. It has broadcast 406 episodes since its debut on TLC in 1996 as Medical Detectives.

== Episodes ==
No. overall	No. in season	Title	Original release date
330	1	"Frozen Assets"	September 12, 2008
In 2004, Mary Ann Clibbery was found brutally murdered in her Illinois business and investigators had to determine if this was a robbery gone wrong or a calculated murder. The evidence at the scene told police what happened and they got a huge break when evidence from the murder was found on top of a nearby frozen river. The investigation focused on the business co-owner George Hansen when police found that he was embezzling from the company and that evidence in the bag also pointed to him.
331	2	"House Hunting"	September 19, 2008
In 2006, Texas real estate agent Sarah Anne Walker was found dead in a model home. Weeks later, a witness came forward who may have seen the killer and police used forensic hypnosis to help him recall every detail of the man's appearance. His description was used to create a composite sketch, which police used to draw the killer Kosoul Chanthakoummane out of hiding.
332	3	"Shoot to Thrill"	October 3, 2008
In 2003, 17-year-old Jason MacLennan returned home after a night out with friends and discovered his widowed father Ken's body lying in a pool of blood. There were shoe impressions outside in the new-fallen snow; because the victim's wallet and watch were missing, the motive may have been robbery. But before making that determination, police needed to find out who had the most to gain from his death. In the end, it is discovered that Jason killed his father with a friend's help, because when Jason's mother died, his father was away on business, and Jason blamed him for his mother's death.
333	4	"Political Thriller"	October 10, 2008
In 2006, Nevada politician Kathy Augustine died mysteriously during a hard-fought re-election campaign and the medical examiner could neither isolate the cause of death, nor explain the tiny puncture wounds discovered during the autopsy. Upon deeper analysis, investigators focus on her husband Chaz Higgs, a critical care nurse who had ready access to succinylcholine.
334	5	"Double Cross"	October 24, 2008
In 1996, Virginia Beach police arrive at the Makdessi apartment to find Elise Makdessi and her lover Quincy Brown dead. Elise's husband, Eddie, had reported that he killed Quincy Brown in self defense after Brown had murdered Elise. Eddie gave the police a videotape Elise had made a week before, alleging that she had been the victim of sexual harassment and assault while in the Navy. Investigators found evidence that her allegations may have been part of an elaborate scheme for financial gain. Hoping to separate fact from fiction, they turned to forensic science.
335	6	"Dancing with the Devil"	October 31, 2008
In 1999, divorced TV cameraman Patrick McRae was found dead in his Des Moines home and the crime scene was awash with blood. Analysis showed it had come from two people, one of whom was female. The male DNA was McRae's, which meant the killer was a woman. Leads dried up and the case went cold until Mars Davis, who had been arrested for drug possession, offered police a deal, and told a bizarre tale of an exotic dancer named Andrea Morris, his girlfriend at the time of the murder, who listened to the voices in her head. Morris confessed that Patrick caught her stealing money, and she killed him because the voices told her he had to die. She was later charged in 2005 and sentenced to life in prison for the murder.
336	7	"Last Dance"	November 14, 2008
In 2000, the body of exotic dancer Rachel Siani was found beneath a New Jersey bridge and investigators wondered if she had committed suicide. Evidence at the scene proved not only that she'd been carried to the bridge and thrown over the side, but also that she was alive when she fell. Police first looked at customers at the gentlemen's club and discovered that Rachel offered to assist a drunk customer named John "Jack" Denofa back to his motel room and that was the last time Rachel was seen alive.
337	8	"Constructive Criticism"	November 21, 2008
In 2000, construction manager Darrell North was found dead in his work trailer in Ft. Worth, Texas. When investigators arrived, they found that he had been stabbed 46 times, described as overkill and indicating a personal relationship between the victim and the attacker. Police hoped that, during the struggle, the killer had left some of his own blood and his DNA behind. Their challenge was to find it. They looked at several suspects, but focused on the last person known to see North alive, sub-contractor Curtis Wayne Pope.
338	9	"Home Evasion"	December 5, 2008
In 2000, Judy Southern arrived home from work and was shot by a gunman waiting within her Spartanburg, South Carolina home. Her husband Allen arrived shortly afterwards, called 911 to report his wife had been shot, and drove her to the hospital. She died on arrival and the investigation focused on her husband Allen, but forensic analysis and a suicide note found at the scene pointed to Jonathan Binney.
339	10	"Window Watcher"	December 12, 2008
In 1986, Gary Dale Larson was stabbed to death in his Edmond, Oklahoma home and then the killer sexually assaulted Larson's girlfriend Janet Haynes. Haynes' story seemed farfetched: The perpetrator was wearing only underwear and gloves, broke into the house, stabbed Larson to death, then raped and terrorized her for hours afterwards. But, the evidence at the scene supported her story, and investigators turned for help from the FBI and their criminal profilers. The case remained cold until 2004, when Jonathan Scott Graham was arrested in the same neighborhood where Larson was murdered as footprint and DNA analysis placed Graham at the scene of the murder.
340	11	"Stranger in the Night"	December 19, 2008
In 1991, 70-year-old Dorothy Donovan was murdered in her Harrington, Delaware home and police are skeptical when her son Charles Holden stated that she was killed by a hitchhiker he had picked up. Charles didn't deny that the murder weapon, a screwdriver, was in his car but claims the hitchhiker picked it up after attacking Charles at an intersection after Charles stopped a few miles short of the stranger's destination and refused to take him the rest of the way. Charles escaped, but later saw the same man skulking around his mother's house, where Charles had a trailer on the edge of the property. Police didn't know how the hitchhiker knew where Charles lived and suspected he murdered his mother himself to pay off some debts with her life insurance. Their suspicions were heightened when he refused to take a polygraph test and they turned to forensic science. Would the blood and fingerprint evidence at the crime scene support Charles' story or prove his guilt? The case went cold for many years until the DNA of ex-con Gilbert Cannon linked him to the crime. Cannon had been high on cocaine and asked Charles to drive him to another town to get his next fix. After they fought in the intersection and Charles fled, Cannon looked for a place to shelter for the night and happened upon Dorothy's house, breaking in because he thought it was empty. When Dorothy woke up, Cannon panicked and stabbed her to death with the screwdriver he took from Charles's car. He was then spotted by Charles as he fled. This told police Charles was telling the truth, but Cannon didn't know about the relationship between Charles and Dorothy and the fact he chose Dorothy's house to break into was just a coincidence.
341	12	"Kidnapping"	January 9, 2009
In 2001, Ginger Hayes and her infant son Nicholas were abducted during a carjacking and the crime had been reported by a witness within minutes of occurrence. 45 minutes after the kidnapping, Ginger is seen with a black man in a local store's surveillance video and then they find her car in a nearby neighborhood. Both the witness to the carjacking and the owner of the home where the car was found pointed to Andre Edwards, but he wouldn't tell the police anything. A farmer 50 miles away called to report the body of a woman and a baby, which were determined to be Ginger, who had been beaten to death and her son Nicholas, who was still alive. Further analysis of Ginger's car and evidence at the scene where Ginger was found both linked Edwards to her death.
342	13	"Sands of Crime"	January 16, 2009
In the early hours of a morning just before Christmas in 1996, a college student was abducted from the parking lot of her apartment. Her body was found later that day; she'd been sexually assaulted and then shot at point blank range. Eight long years passed and then a pair of running shoes and a cell phone breathed new life into a very cold case.
343	14	"Calculated Coincidence"	February 6, 2009
In 2002, a young woman is found dead in her apartment. There's little evidence at the scene, leads don't pan out, and the case turns cold. Then the police discover a link between their prime suspect and an unsolved murder committed six years earlier in a different state.
344	15	"Sworded Scheme"	January 30, 2009
When a college student is reported missing, police believe their investigation will be like countless others, and she'd turn up a few days later. But when they discover blood spatter in her boyfriend's bedroom, blood spatter someone had gone to great lengths to conceal, they know this case is going to be different.
345	16	"Unmasked"	February 20, 2009
A serial rapist is on the loose in a Texas town. No one knew where he'd strike next, but the audacity of his attacks and the escalation of violence against his victims made finding him imperative.
346	17	"Fashion Police"	March 13, 2009
The victim has been stabbed more than thirty-seven times, and the crime scene is awash with her blood. Near her head, police discover a distinctive button with strands of thread still attached. If they can find the owner of the shirt the button came from, they'll also find the killer.
347	18	"Church Dis-service"	April 3, 2009
In 1998, a young woman (Dawnia Dacosta) attends evening church services... then disappears. When her abandoned car is found, the tank is empty and a gas can she kept in her trunk for emergencies is missing. Eyewitnesses place her at a nearby gas station, getting into a van, but their descriptions of the vehicle don't match. Three days later when her body is discovered, the search for the driver of that van (Lucious Boyd) intensifies.
348	19	"Seedy Intentions"	April 17, 2009
On July 4, 1996, when a nine-year-old girl goes missing, police and volunteers spend weeks searching for her. A psychic's vision leads to a field where her body is discovered, along with what investigators hope is enough evidence to help them to also find her killer.
349	20	"DNA Dragnet"	May 15, 2009
Digital enhancement of security camera video shows that what appears to be a casual encounter is actually a forced abduction, leading to murder. The perpetrator's MO is remarkably similar to another murder which occurred five months earlier, 15 miles away. When investigators learn the crimes might not be isolated or random, they also realize a serial killer may be on the loose.
350	21	"Smiley Face"	May 22, 2009
The woman had been sexually assaulted, stabbed repeatedly, and left for dead. She survived, and gave police a detailed description of her attacker. When someone who fit that description practically turned himself in, police were sure they had their man, until the DNA evidence proved them wrong.
351	22	"Dirty Laundry"	June 5, 2009
The victim was a self-made man who never minced words. Perhaps he was murdered by a disgruntled client or employee. Perhaps the racy photos in his safe held the clue to solving the crime. Or perhaps with the help of the IRS, investigators could follow the money and find the killer.
352	23	"Drowning Sorrows"	June 12, 2009
In 2003, a family vacation turned into a nightmare when the wife is found face-down in the lake. There are no witnesses and little conclusive evidence to help police determine if they're dealing with a suicide, an accident, or something more sinister, until a forensic pathologist uses a groundbreaking technique to discover the truth.
353	24	"As Fault"	June 19, 2009
The woman in the back of the truck was flailing her arms, screaming. They thought she was doing something dangerous for the fun of it. But when they found a jacket near a pool of blood, they knew what they'd seen wasn't a joy ride; it was an abduction.
354	25	"Family Ties"	July 17, 2009
When court clerk Peter Porco doesn't report to his work in November 2004, a court's officer is ordered to the Porcos' family home in Bethlehem, NY. Inside the home he finds murdered Peter Porco and his barely alive wife Joan who had both been savagely attacked with a fireman's axe. Eventually police can prove the crime was committed by the couple's son, Christopher Porco.
355	26	"Trouble Brewing"	July 24, 2009
Two suspects living together were linked to a murder by bloodstained boots and a gun – items that belonged to the one who claimed he’d never met the victim. Police hoped the manufacturing code on beer bottles would prove who was telling the truth.
356	27	"Holy Terror"	August 14, 2009
This episode documents a deadly bombing at a church in Oakwood, Illinois on December 30, 1997.
357	28	"Needle in a Haystack"	August 28, 2009
There was no apparent reason for the young, healthy college student to be dead. But when the medical examiner found the tiniest of clues during the autopsy, investigators were able to unravel the mystery of betrayal and revenge.
358	29	"Room With A View"	September 11, 2009
In 1998, the victim had been stabbed more than a hundred times; her bedroom was blood-soaked. While her body was positioned in a suggestive way, she hadn’t been sexually assaulted. Was this a sex crime, or the random act of a man with an intense hatred of women?
359	30	"Dollars and Sense"	September 25, 2009
On Christmas Eve 2005, the corpse of a black male is found burning near Baltimore. He's eventually identified as 26-year-old Wesley Person. Distinctive building materials from the 1930s found near the body play a crucial role in solving this case.
360	31	"Hair Line"	October 2, 2009
Doctors don't know why the young scientist is gravely ill. When tests finally reveal the cause, it's too late to save him. Police hope that lab analysis of his hair, showing when attempts were made on his life and what was used will lead to the killer.
361	32	"All That Glitters is Gold"	October 16, 2009
A bullet-riddled car, a missing driver, and no witnesses. Was this an ambush or a random attack? Had the victim been abducted or was she dead? The answers lay in a unique clue, so tiny it was measured in millionths of a meter.
362	33	"Deadly Rebellion"	October 30, 2009
Even though their daughter had run away before, she'd always come back. Her parents were sure this time would be no different, but they were wrong. Workers discovered the teen's half-naked body on the side of the road; her throat had been slit. Police hoped the single foreign hair found in a defensive wound on her thumb would lead them to the killer.
363	34	"Sign of the Crime"	November 13, 2009
In little more than a month, two women who lived in the same apartment complex were brutally murdered. The similarities of the crime scenes led police to conclude they were dealing with a serial killer who harbored an intense hatred of women... and they had to find him before he struck again.
364	35	"Covet Thy Neighbor"	November 20, 2009
When a college student vanished without a trace, her fellow students were concerned about her safety and their own. Weeks later, the body of an unknown female was discovered 700 miles away in the ashes of a barn fire, and an alert police officer realized the two crimes might be connected.
365	36	"Writing on the Wall"	December 4, 2009
The victim was well liked and successful, which made the brutality of the crime even harder to understand. In the final moments of her life, she'd written a name on the wall presumably that of the killer in her own blood. But this wasn't an open and shut case and in order to solve it, investigators would have to read between the lines.
366	37	"Hundreds of Reasons"	December 11, 2009
An assistant manager of a Florida steakhouse is stabbed to death on December 12, 2005. It appears to be a robbery gone wrong, but a bloody fingerprint reveals that he knew his killer.
367	38	"Cold Feet"	December 18, 2009
On November 17, 1985, James Kenneth Elmen Jr. abducted Julie Estes, then 21, from the Southside convenience store where she worked. He raped and murdered her. Her body was found the next day, but the killing went unsolved until 2003 when it became the first murder arrest by the new cold case squad at the Jacksonville Sheriff's Office. A sample of Elmen's blood was taken after sentencing for the 1986 rape and kidnapping of another woman and the attempted abduction of a third and his DNA was entered into a database, which was eventually matched to Estes' DNA. Elmen is also a suspect in the 1985 murder of his 10-year-old half sister, Dana Loomis, and the slaying of a female acquaintance, Christina Casey. In June 1984 a jury acquitted Elmen of killing Steven Linthicum of Titusville.
368	39	"Separation Anxiety"	January 8, 2010
Tracey Frame, 35, was convicted of killing her boyfriend, David Nixon, in April 2002 after he planned to end their relationship. She later tried to dump his body in the sewer, but it wouldn't fit, so she set it on fire.
369	40	"Office Visit"	March 5, 2010
On October 5, 2004 a surgeon was stabbed to death, and the most likely suspect was seen in a restaurant at the time of the murder. Episode documents the murder of Brian Stidham.
370	41	"Palm Saturday"	March 12, 2010
In 2007, Brian & Beverly Mauck were found dead in their Graham, Washington home. Using a bloody palm print and shoe prints at the scene, investigators focus their attention on neighbor Daniel Tavares, who had previously been inking a tattoo on Brian's back.
371	42	"Shoe-In for Murder"	March 19, 2010
On May 12, 1994, Crystal Perry was viciously murdered in her home in Bridgton, Maine. Michael Hutchinson, 32, was found guilty of murder in the 1994 slaying at Perry's home.
372	43	"Family Interrupted"	April 2, 2010
On December 10, 2003, in a murder-for-hire scheme, Thomas "Bart" Whitaker hired Chris Brashear, his college roommate, to kill his family so he could inherit the estimated $1.5 million family estate.
373	44	"Runaway Love"	April 16, 2010
Rachael Mullenix, 19, was convicted of stabbing her mother, Barbara Mullenix, on September 13, 2006, and then packing her bloodied corpse in a cardboard box before dumping it in Newport Bay on the California coast.
374	45	"Watchful Eye"	April 30, 2010
On May 20, 2001, Carrie Nelson, then 20, was beaten to death while working alone in a park office. The case went unsolved for six years until May 2007 when, in a routine check of DNA samples of prison inmates in South Dakota, police found a match with DNA samples gathered from the crime scene. The samples linked Randy Leeroyal Swaney, 35, to the murder. In August 2008, Randy Swaney was sentenced to life in prison.
375	46	"Waste Mis-Management"	May 14, 2010
Foul play is suspected when Fort Worth factory worker Glenda Furch disappears in September 2007 after completing her shift.
376	47	"Dirty Little Secret"	May 28, 2010
In 2002, police get a clue about a couple who disappeared on Memorial Day weekend, during an in-progress robbery in Ocean City, Maryland. The evidence found solves the brutal murders of Joshua Ford and Martha Crutchley by killers Erika and Benjamin Sifrit.
377	48	"Lights Out"	June 11, 2010
The March 3, 1987 murder of young housewife Kathryn Odom in her Spring, Texas home is investigated.
378	49	"Pet Rock"	June 25, 2010
In 1995, Palm Beach waitress Denise O'Neill is abducted and murdered. Her neighbor Luis Caballero arouses suspicions by his odd behavior towards tv crews covering the crime. In the end police can prove Caballero and two other men committed the murder.
379	50	"Best Foot Forward"	July 9, 2010
In 2007, Shamaia Smith disappeared from the strip club she worked at in East Hartford, CT. Police look at various customers of the strip club, but focus on local businessman Kenneth Otto when there were inconsistencies with his story about the last time he had seen her. Upon search of Otto's rural property, cadaver dogs find something in a fire pit, at which time he revokes their access. Upon revisit to the property, investigators find a variety of trace evidence, including part of a human foot.
