= Partin =

Partin is a surname. Notable people with the surname include:

- Alan W. Partin (1961–2023), American prostate surgeon and researcher
- Darryl Partin (born 1987), American basketball player
- Edward Grady Partin (1924–1990), American labor leader
- Phillup Partin (born 1965), American convicted murderer

== See also ==
- Gartin
- Martin (name)
