= South Dakota Women's Prison =

Prison in Pierre, South Dakota, United States

- Location within South Dakota Location within the United States
- Location: Pierre, South Dakota; 44°21′28″N 100°18′29″W
- Status: Open
- Opened: October 23, 1997
- Website: doc.sd.gov/adult/facilities/wp/

The South Dakota Women's Prison is located in Pierre, South Dakota, U.S., and is part of the Solem Public Safety Center run by the South Dakota Department of Corrections. The facility includes the prison grounds and building, offices, and law enforcement agencies.

In 1995, the South Dakota Lesgislature approved funding for construction of a new state women's prison. The prison opened and was dedicated on October 23, 1997.

The prison hosts a mother and infant program and in 2018 introduced a methamphetamine addiction rehabilitation program.

== Notable prisoners ==
- Daphne Wright, convicted of the murder of Darlene VanderGiesen
