= Murder of Darlene VanderGiesen =

2006 murder in South Dakota

- Location: Sioux Falls, South Dakota, U.S.
- Date: February 1, 2006
- Attack type: Murder
- Deaths: 1
- Perpetrator: Daphne Wright
- Verdict: Guilty
- Convictions: First-degree murder
- Sentence: Life imprisonment without the possibility of parole

Darlene Kay VanderGiesen (died February 1, 2006) was a Deaf American woman murdered in Sioux Falls, South Dakota. Initially reported missing, her dismembered remains were later recovered in rural Rock County, Minnesota, and in the Sioux Falls landfill. Her cause of death could not be officially determined but was ruled to either have been due to suffocation or blunt force trauma.

Daphne Wright, the ex-girlfriend of VanderGiesen's friend, was convicted of first-degree murder and kidnapping on April 11, 2007. The investigation revealed that VanderGiesen had been taken to Wright's home, where she had been murdered, burned, and dismembered with a chainsaw. Wright was the first woman in South Dakota history to face the death penalty, but following the trial, she was sentenced to life imprisonment without possibility of parole.

== Background and disappearance ==
Darlene Kay VanderGiesen was originally from Kansas but raised in Rock Valley, Iowa. She graduated from the Iowa School for the Deaf in 1983 and moved to Sioux Falls, South Dakota, in 1992. She was active in the South Dakota Association for the Deaf and played softball on a deaf club team.

In September 2004, Sallie Collins moved into an apartment complex in Sioux Falls. Collins, who is deaf, chose the location because many of the residents were also deaf. One such resident was VanderGiesen, and the two began a friendship. Daphne Wright, Collins's girlfriend, reportedly became jealous of the friendship, although it remained platonic. Wright argued with VanderGiesen weeks before the murder, accusing her of attempting to break up the couple. Wright also sent emails, insulting VanderGiesen and warning her to stay away from Collins. Sometime later, VanderGiesen told her family that the two had reconciled and that they were friends again.

On February 1, 2006, VanderGiesen left her job and met Wright at a local Pizza Hut parking lot and entered her car, under the expectation the two would be planning a Valentine's Day surprise for Collins. This was the last time VanderGiesen was seen alive.

== Investigation ==
VanderGiesen was reported missing to the Sioux Falls Police Department on February 3 after failing to show up to work for two days. Her abandoned car was found in the Pizza Hut parking lot, with her keys, wallet, and identification missing. Initially, police and VanderGiesen's family worried that she might have been taken by a man she had met on the Internet. Police interviewed a male acquaintance but ruled out his involvement.

Family and friends congregated at VanderGiesen's apartment, where they interacted with Wright. VanderGiesen's mother recalled, "She came to me and told me who she was. She gave me a hug, and she said she was sorry that Darlene was missing, that they were friends and she would be praying that we would find Darlene soon". VanderGiesen's sister showed police the emails that Wright had sent. The emails were traced to Wright's home but were sent using a pseudonym. Another acquaintance told police about the argument. Police conducted a search warrant at Wright's home on February 7 and turned up multiple pieces of evidence, including bone and tissue fragments in the basement that were later identified as VanderGiesen's through DNA testing.

On February 10, Wright was arrested at a Sioux Falls Hotel. During questioning, Wright admitted to the feud with VanderGiesen and to sending the emails but said they had reconciled and denied involvement in the murder. Wright was charged with aggravated kidnapping, first-degree murder, and second-degree murder. At her arraignment on February 14, Wright pleaded not guilty. The state sought the death penalty, making Wright the first woman in South Dakota history to face capital punishment.

On February 11 and 21, partial remains belonging to VanderGiesen were recovered from the Sioux Falls landfill. Her body had been partially burned and dismembered at the torso and legs. On March 28, additional remains were located in Rock County, Minnesota, in a ditch on the side of Rock County 6. A plastic bag had been tied around her head. An autopsy reported that either blunt force trauma to the back of VanderGiesen's head or suffocation may have been the cause of death.

DNA taken from VanderGiesen's remains was matched to samples taken from Wright's shirt, car, and basement, and a carpet discarded at a Sioux Falls landfill. Wright's roommate testified that she witnessed Wright removing the carpet after VanderGiesen disappeared. Receipts were found suggesting Wright purchased a chainsaw, as well as trash bags found with VanderGiesen's remains. Blankets recovered at both the landfill and in Rock County, as well as a rope tied around VanderGiesen's neck, matched those in Wright's home.

Prior to trial, Wright underwent a psychological evaluation, which assessed her reading level equivalent to that of a third grader and found that she had limited verbal communication. The psychologist noted although Wright was fluent in American Sign Language (ASL), the language had limited signs for legal concepts, further complicated by Wright being prelingually deaf.

== Trial ==
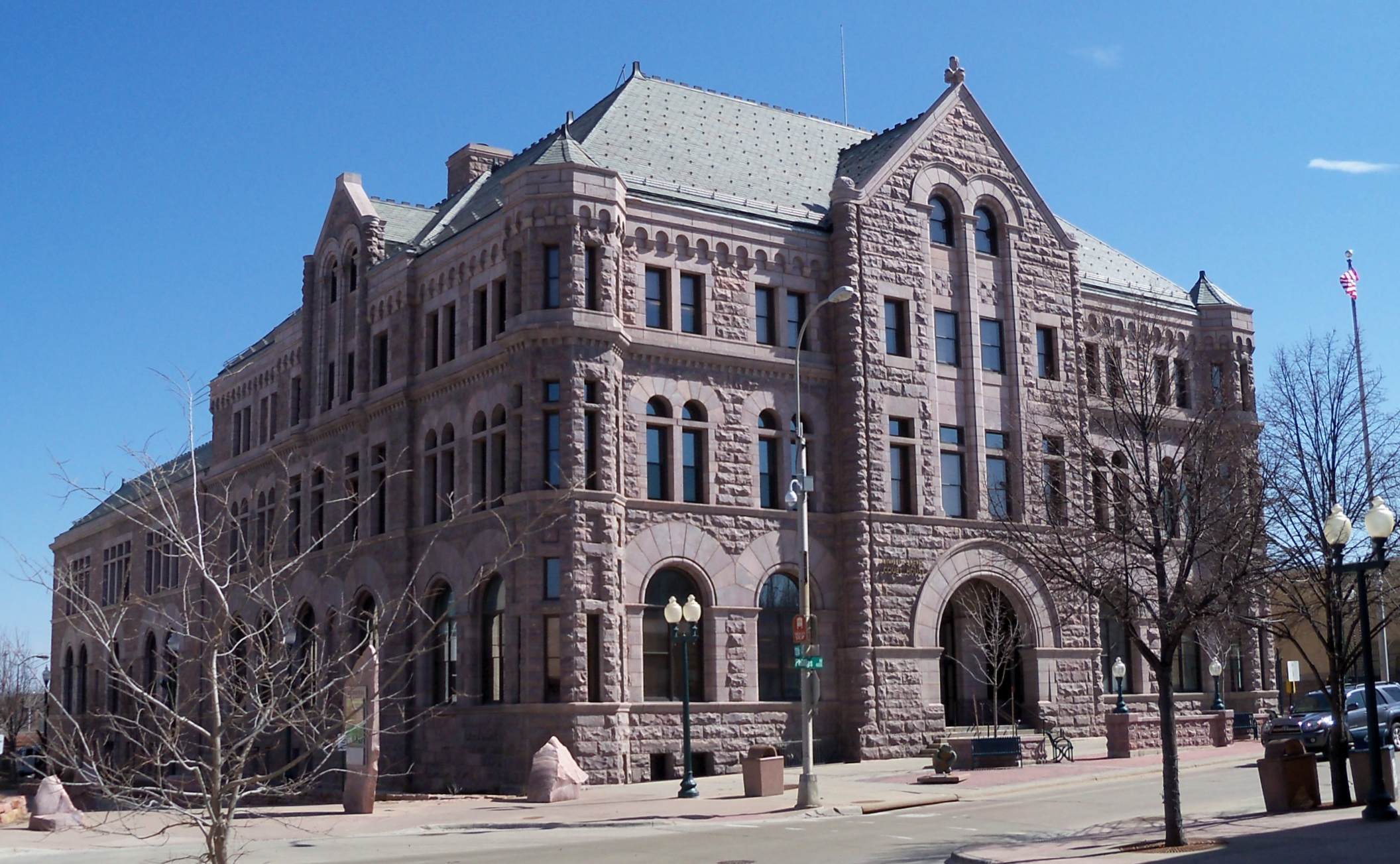
The trial took place at the U.S. Courthouse, Sioux Falls.

Jury selection lasted four weeks. Jurors were asked questions pertaining to their views on race (Wright is African American; VanderGiesen was white), sexual orientation, deafness, and capital punishment. The defense questioned the composition of the jury selection pool, as none of the 150 were African American. The selected jury consisted of 11 women and 1 man.

The trial began on April 2, 2007, presided over by Circuit Court Judge Brad Zell. An ASL interpreter was provided for Wright. Several deaf audience members attended the trial, and a transcript was broadcast on a screen in the courtroom.

The prosecution argued that Wright had killed VanderGiesen in a fit of rage, jealous of VanderGiesen's friendship with Wright's former lover. The prosecution requested to show a video of a pig being dismembered with the same type of chainsaw used in the crime, but this was denied. The defense attempted unsuccessfully to block images of VanderGiesen's remains and all testimony pertaining to dismemberment. An Ace Hardware cashier testified that Wright had purchased a chainsaw and oil for the blade on February 3. A detective corroborated that marks on the basement floor corresponded with the use of a chainsaw, and that investigators smelled petroleum when fresh paint in the basement was lifted.

The defense argued that there was a lack of evidence tying Wright to the murder, and that although the emails were insulting, they were not threats, and criticized lack of DNA testing on other evidence.

The defense argued that the death penalty would be cruel and unusual punishment and that it would violate the Eighth Amendment, saying although Wright was intelligent, her communication was hindered by her deafness, and that being deaf since childhood placed her at a disadvantage to defend herself. The defense compared her deafness to mental impairment. Circuit Court Judge Brad Zell cited three previous death penalty sentencings imposed on deaf defendants.

On April 11, after eight hours of deliberation, the jury found Wright guilty of all three counts. The prosecution said Wright deserved the death penalty for the dismemberment, calling it "the act of a depraved mind". Wright's defense argued that she had only carried out the burning and dismemberment as a practical means of disposing or the body rather than "for some perverse pleasure". Instead of the death penalty, she was sentenced on April 18 to two life sentences without parole, to be served concurrently, and was transferred to the South Dakota Women's Prison.

=== Appeals ===
In 2009, Wright's attorneys filed an appeal against her conviction, citing insufficient interpretation accommodations, errors in the jury selection process, double jeopardy concerns, that Wright had not been read her Miranda Rights early enough, and certain evidence allowed in the court proceedings. The appeal was rejected and Wright's conviction upheld on June 24.

Wright filed a writ of habeas corpus in 2010, seeking a new judge to review the case and citing ineffective assistance of counsel.

== Reactions and aftermath ==
Initially, fears spread amongst the local deaf community that VanderGiesen had been targeted due to her deafness. A vigil was held for VanderGiesen following the announcement of her death. VanderGiesen was buried in her hometown of Rock Valley, Iowa. In 2009, the VanderGiesen family published a book about Darlene's life. Proceeds were donated to the Furniture Mission in Sioux Falls.

Although VanderGiesen was heterosexual, the media dubbed the case a "lesbian love triangle". The case sparked conversation about capital punishment against deaf defendants.

The forensic analysis used in the murder, particularly of the use of the chainsaw, was presented at the annual American Academy of Forensic Sciences conference in 2010. Investigators tested a chainsaw similar to the one used in the murder on a pig to determine how much blood spatter might have been created. Their findings were published in the Journal of Forensic Sciences in 2009.

The murder and subsequent trial were covered in a 2010 episode of Forensic Files in the show's 14th season, entitled "Hear No Evil". The murder was also featured in an episode of Deadly Women during the show's 3rd season.
