= Forensic Files season 11 =

Forensic Files
- Season 11
- No. of episodes: 42

Release
- Original network: Court TV
- Original release: July 19, 2006 – May 2, 2007

Season chronology
- ← Previous; Season 10 Next → Season 12

Forensic Files is an American documentary-style series which reveals how forensic science is used to solve violent crimes, mysterious accidents, and even outbreaks of illness. The series was broadcast on Court TV, narrated by Peter Thomas, and produced by Medstar Television, in association with Court TV Original Productions. It has broadcast 406 episodes since its debut on TLC in 1996 as Medical Detectives.

== Episodes ==
No. overall	No. in season	Title	Original release date
258	1	"Naughty or Nyce"	July 19, 2006
In 2004, 34-year-old Michelle Nyce could have lost control of her SUV on the icy road, and plunged down an embankment into a shallow creek. But there were footprints in the snow leading away. With these footprints, along with other evidence that contradicted the testimony of Michelle's husband Jonathan, investigators determined the death was the result not of an accident but a fight over Michelle's infidelity, which led to Jonathan beating Michelle to death in a jealous rage, after which he panicked and staged the accident. Jonathan Nyce was convicted of killing his wife, but given the circumstances, was only sentenced to 8 years in prison.
259	2	"Going for Broke"	July 26, 2006
In 1991, stockbroker Michael Prozumenshikov told his wife he would be working late, and when he did not come home, she reported him missing. Investigators found his car a few blocks from his office and, two days later, proof that he had been murdered.
260	3	"Just Desserts"	August 2, 2006
32-year-old Henry Sullivan had a criminal record, and his driver's license was found at the scene of the brutal double homicide of Richard and Karla van Dusen in 2003. That physical evidence seemed damning, but it was not the only evidence. DNA extracted from a discarded spoon would point investigators in a different direction, and eventually proved Sullivan's neighbor William DeParvine was the actual killer. DeParvine wanted an antique truck that Richard was selling, but couldn't afford it, so he killed the couple to get the truck without paying, planting Sullivan's license to frame him. But thanks to the DNA, Sullivan was exonerated, while DeParvine got the death penalty.
261	4	"Sunday's Wake"	August 9, 2006
In 2000, when a little girl got sick and died, investigators were stumped. Was it an accident, an unexplained illness, or murder? Scientists would travel halfway around the world before finding the answer in two unlikely places: a shredded legal document and her mother's signature.
262	5	"Shattered Dreams"	August 16, 2006
In 2001, a car was found in a drainage ditch and the bodies of a man and woman were inside; both had been shot to death. The car windows were broken and shattered glass should have been everywhere, but it was not. A fingertip torn from a latex glove would point investigators to both the crime scene and the killer.
263	6	"Dockter Visit"	August 23, 2006
On October 20, 1993, 76-year-old Walter Yokum, a retired accountant and World War II veteran, was found dead in his Boulder County, Colorado home, and the investigation ground to a halt when the prime suspect, James Dobson, had a solid alibi. But a lucky break led to a shady character who wore distinctive boots and had a sweet tooth; 29-year-old Kevin Dockter. Dockter and his friend, 21-year-old Jason Fowler, had been robbing Yokum's house for drug money, but when Yokum caught them, Dockter killed him. Dockter was convicted of second-degree murder and sentenced to 40 years in prison, while Fowler got 25 years.
264	7	"Murder, She Wrote"	August 30, 2006
On March 29, 2000, a woman who was known to have suffered from depression apparently took her own life. But her sister told police that, a year before her death, she said if anything were to happen to her, there was a note in the china cabinet. Investigators found the note and the killer.
265	8	"Concrete Alibi"	September 6, 2006
Karyn Slover, 23, an aspiring model and mother, was killed in 1996. The prime suspect was her boyfriend David Swann, but when he was eventually cleared, investigators had to dig deeper to find the perpetrator. With the help of a forensic geologist, they identified the most unlikely suspects. Michael and Jeanette Slover, the parents of Karyn's ex-husband Michael Slover Jr., had killed her because they didn't want her to move away and take her son with her. It was proven that Michael Jr. was also involved, and he and his father were both sentenced to 65 years in prison, while his mother received 60 years.
266	9	"Key Evidence"	September 13, 2006
In 2001, in Rockford, Illinois, 38-year-old Kevin Rice, an off-duty policeman, was shot dead. His fellow officers were determined to solve the crime. They needed clues to find the killer, and they discovered them in tiny fibers and an asthma inhaler. With just these two pieces of evidence, detectives managed to prove that 19-year-old William Buck was the killer. Rice had seen Buck and his friend Vincent Holmes trying to break into a car, and Buck killed Rice in a panic. As a result, Buck was sentenced to 68 years in prison for Rice’s murder. Holmes testified against Buck and was granted immunity.
267	10	"The Gambler"	September 20, 2006
One warm summer afternoon in 2003, the town of Verona, Wisconsin, faced its first triple homicide. To solve the case, investigators had to delve into the world of high rollers and offshore betting.
268	11	"Weakest Link"	September 27, 2006
The body of a young girl was discovered on isolated farmland near Delano, California on September 7, 1987. She had no ID, but police found mailbox and house keys in the pocket of her jeans. With no other clues, they checked the mailboxes of every apartment building in Delano and their persistence paid off.
269	12	"Capitol Crimes"	October 4, 2006
The driver said he could not have hit and killed a pedestrian on a Harrisburg, Pennsylvania street. The Jeep Grand Cherokee he was leasing around that time had been sold months ago to a buyer in another state. Police were able to find the vehicle. They impounded it, took it apart, and discovered evidence, which would tell them what really happened that night.
270	13	"Undertaken"	October 11, 2006
The medical examiner ruled the death of 29-year-old handyman Frankie Pullian in 1980 an accident, but the detectives investigating the case thought the evidence at the scene indicated otherwise. It would take three years, an exhumation and a second autopsy to determine who was right. The truth was shocking: Frankie’s boss, undertaker E. Lee White, had orchestrated his murder for financial gain, and he was sentenced to life.
271	14	"Dark Waters"	October 18, 2006
When a hit-and-run boating accident caused the death of a popular young man in 2002, investigators faced the daunting task of searching for one boat among 1200 others. They asked anyone who had seen the accident to come forward. The man who responded did much more than witness the crash; he was a passenger in that other boat.
272	15	"Nice Threads"	October 25, 2006
27-year-old Dawn Fehring was found dead on the bedroom floor of her apartment in 1995. The crime scene yielded little of value, and investigators wondered if they would find enough evidence to make a case, much less catch a killer. But a bloodstained sheet and a breakthrough forensic technique enabled them to identify the murderer, Eric Hayden, and convince the jury of his guilt. Hayden was sentenced to 26 years in prison.
273	16	"Grave Danger"	November 1, 2006
In 2004, a young man was killed in a mysterious car crash, but the evidence at the scene led investigators to believe it was not an accident. Forensic science revealed what really happened, and the truth devastated three families.
274	17	"Internal Affair"	November 8, 2006
When a woman went missing in 1998, friends and family were determined to find her. Their worst fears were confirmed weeks later when her body was discovered. Blood evidence and computer forensics helped investigators to catch the killer, and convince the jury of his guilt.
275	18	"A Case of the Flue"	November 15, 2006
In 1993, 82-year-old Kathryn Bishop was found dead in her Hummelstown, Pennsylvania home. The evidence at the scene indicated that the perpetrator had been running out of the house, not breaking into it. Tiny clues on the victim's body would tell police what happened that night, which gave investigators the proof they need that chimney sweep Timothy McEnany was the perpetrator. Timothy had planned to rob Kathryn's house, even calling ahead and thinking she was asleep when he got no answer, but when he got to the house and broke in, it turned out Kathryn was awake and had not picked up the phone because her hearing was bad. As a result, Timothy was forced to kill Kathryn to avoid identification, and he was sentenced to life in prison.
276	19	"No Safe Place"	November 22, 2006
On March 18, 1998, a wealthy man and his wife were attacked by three men outside their Youngsville, Louisiana home. He was shot dead and she was forced to open their hidden safe. The woman could not describe the men because they wore masks. To solve the case, police would have to find out who knew about the concealed safe, and who would benefit from the crime.
277	20	"Live Wire"	November 29, 2006
On January 6, 2001, a bomb killed 44-year-old teacher Lillian Jarvis while maiming her mother and boyfriend. A search for clues identified Lillian's 39-year-old ex-husband William as the killer. William had been financially ruined when Lillian divorced him and was also jealous of her new relationship, so he killed her, not caring that their daughter was also in the house. William Jarvis was convicted of the bombing and received a triple life sentence.
278	21	"Van-ished"	December 6, 2006
A twelve-year-old girl in Brazoria County, Texas claimed she had been abducted and sexually assaulted. She recounted what happened in such a flat, unemotional voice that police found it difficult to believe her. Fibers on her clothing would prove she was telling the truth, and help police to find her attacker.
279	22	"A Novel Idea"	December 13, 2006
In 2001, paramedics in Durham, North Carolina, received a frantic call from Michael Peterson who said his wife Kathleen had fallen down the stairs and that she was unconscious, but still breathing. When paramedics arrived, they could do little more than pronounce the woman dead. The number and volume of bloodstains at the scene was greater than usual. It was up to forensic scientists to find out why. They soon determined Michael had beaten Kathleen to death on the stairs, and he was sentenced to life.
280	23	"Chief Suspect"	December 20, 2006
On April 11, 1995, the wife of a respected police officer was murdered in her own home. The crime went unsolved for more than a decade, and then a newly formed Cold Case Unit took a fresh look at the evidence. A few seconds of a 911 call enabled them to determine not only who was responsible for the victim's death, but also the motive for her murder.
281	24	"Water Hazard"	December 27, 2006
In March 1986, 46-year-old Julie Ann Williams had ingested a massive amount of cyanide. That previous weekend, her colleague Diane Harry had almost died twice shortly after her husband Lewis received letters threatening her life. An unlikely clue—a flaw on a mailing envelope—exposed a murderer who was willing to kill innocent people to get revenge on his intended victim. Lewis Harry had been having an affair, and the alleged threats were sent by his mistress’ ex-boyfriend, who was extremely jealous; however, he had in fact sent only one letter which just demanded Lewis stop seeing her. Lewis had used that letter to forge more threatening letters in the ex-boyfriend’s handwriting, then attempted to kill his wife by poisoning the water cooler at her office, with hopes of clearing the way for his mistress, while getting her ex-boyfriend sent to prison so he wouldn’t bother them anymore. However, the flawed envelope blew the whole plot wide open. Lewis Harry was sentenced to life in prison for the murder of Julie Ann Williams and the attempted murder of his wife.
282	25	"Shell Game"	January 3, 2007
They thought the fire would cover their crime, but one tiny clue, no bigger than a thumbtack, remained. It held all the information investigators needed to put a trio of cold-blooded killers behind bars.
283	26	"Ring Him Up"	January 10, 2007
In 1994, 19-year-old college student Shannon Melendi disappeared while at Emory University in Atlanta. For ten years, her disappearance of remained a mystery, until new scientific testing cast a different light on Colvin "Butch" Hinton, who had been a suspect from the beginning.
284	27	"Killer Impression"	January 17, 2007
The death of Crystal Purcell on July 27, 1987 was considered an accident. Almost 14 years later, Barbara Purcell called police to suggest that her estranged husband Willard had killed Crystal. On June 6, 2001, before that investigation could begin, Barbara was found dead in much the same manner as Crystal. Was this an unfortunate coincidence or the MO of a serial killer? Investigators were not sure, but they were able to prove Willard had killed Barbara as a result of their marriage deteriorating, and he was sentenced to 20 to life. However, no one has ever tied Willard to Crystal's death.
285	28	"If I Were You"	January 24, 2007
In 1994, Paul Gruber's daughter suspected something was wrong when she received birthday cards addressed from Gruber, on which the handwriting was not Gruber's. When she then learned virtually everything had been removed from her father's Sandpoint, Idaho home, she was sure of it. Investigators soon discover that Gruber had hired handyman Darryl Kuehl, who killed Gruber and then went about keeping up the appearance that Gruber was still alive.
286	29	"As the Tide Turns"	January 31, 2007
On August 17, 2002, April Barber was dead. Her husband Justin had been shot four times but he survived. When Justin's version of events was at variance with the evidence, investigators turned to forensic science, hoping to determine if this was a botched robbery, or cold-blooded murder. In the end, they successfully determined Justin killed his wife and shot himself because April wanted to divorce him due to Justin's cheating and gambling debts. Justin Barber was convicted of his wife's murder and sentenced to life without parole.
287	30	"A Tight Leash"	February 7, 2007
How did the stalker obtain the security system code for his victim's home? How did he steal her personal photographs? Police needed answers, and they found them in the most unlikely of places: the letters he wrote to frighten the victim and taunt those trying to protect her.
288	31	"Muffled Cries"	February 14, 2007
On November 12, 2004, after inspecting storm damage to a home in Tampa, Florida the insurance assessor simply disappeared. Thirty hours later, her body was found in a nearby river. But the killer had been careless, using a murder weapon so unique and leaving behind clues so blatant that police would have no trouble tracking him down.
289	32	"Critical Maneuver"	February 21, 2007
When a hit-and-run accident claimed the life of a high school athlete on August 19, 2004, everyone in town mourned his passing. Finding the killer was a long shot at best, but investigators hoped tiny paint chips and pieces of plastic found at the scene would lead them to the person who was behind the wheel.
290	33	"Skirting the Evidence"	February 28, 2007
In 1996, 25-year-old Shannon Sanderson goes to the casino without her 58-year-old second husband, Robert, and wins $5,000 at the Blackjack tables. Three hours later, she is abducted by a man driving a Chevy Beretta and a month later, she was found dead. The trail turned cold, until police got a call from a woman whose husband, 48-year-old Gerald Powers, had a criminal past and a fondness for Chevy Berettas. Police managed to match fibers in Powers’ car with the skirt Shannon was wearing when she disappeared. Powers was sentenced to death.
291	34	"Small Town Terror"	March 7, 2007
In 1991, Grand Junction, Colorado is on edge after a series of deadly bombings which killed 2 and injured one more and police race to find the culprit before he strikes again. Ultimately, it was the bombs themselves, along with the tools used to make them, which led investigators to James Genrich.
292	35	"Fresh Heir"	March 14, 2007
Lives changed in the 20 years following the unsolved August 9, 1986 murder of 51-year-old Lynnea Gran in Superior, Wisconsin, and so did forensic science. In time, a high-powered microscope and DNA profiling revealed not only a clue no one had seen before but also the identity of the killer. Marlene’s son Rodger, who was only 17 at the time, had killed her in a fight over money. Rodger Gran pleaded guilty to second-degree murder and was sentenced to 15 years.
293	36	"Ticker Tape"	March 21, 2007
72-year-old David Crawford, a lifelong resident of the tiny town of Lefroy, Tasmania, was murdered outside his own home on October 9, 2000. Robbery appeared to be the motive, but with no suspects, the investigation came to a halt. Then the victim's autopsy turned the investigation into a landmark forensics case: The device intended to save his life proved to be the only witness to his death. This helped police to identify 20-year-old Ivan Jones as Crawford’s killer. Crawford had caught Jones trying to burglarize a neighbor’s house, and Jones killed him in the heat of the moment. Jones was sentenced to 20 years in prison.
294	37	"Step by Step"	March 28, 2007
When 66-year-old wealthy socialite Bette Lucas died after falling down the stairs in 1988, the eye witnesses said one thing and the evidence seemed to indicate another. To find out what really happened, investigators turned to forensic science, a physicist and an expert in accident reconstruction. This determined Bette's son Steven had killed her after she planned to disinherit him and staged the accident to inherit the estate. Steven Lucas was sentenced to 30 years in prison.
295	38	"Blanket of Evidence"	April 4, 2007
On September 28, 1997, Kelly Eckart's car was found with her belongings still in it, after working the late shift in Franklin, Indiana. Days later, her body was found in an isolated ravine. Tiny clues told police a great deal about the killer: He would own a car with olive-colored carpeting, a white blanket and distinctive bullets made from wax, not lead. Investigators turn to Michael Overstreet, after receiving a tip from his brother Scott.
296	39	"Fired-Up"	April 11, 2007
On February 4, 1996, when Derrick Duehren returned to his Gales Creek, Oregon home, it had burned to the ground and his wife Roxanne's charred remains were found in the rubble. Investigators set out to determine if it was an accident or arson and murder.
297	40	"Two in a Million"	April 18, 2007
A millionaire and his family were executed in their own home on April 19, 1992. For three years, the murders went unsolved and then a 30-year-old box of ammunition and some fluorescent fibers revealed the ultimate betrayal.
298	41	"Bitter Brew"	April 25, 2007
It was one of the most brazen crimes of the 20th century. Adolph Coors III, chairman of the Coors Brewing Company, was kidnapped on February 9, 1960 and held for ransom prompting one of the most intense manhunts in United States history.
299	42	"Message in a Bottle"	May 2, 2007
For twelve years, the murder of a young woman from Poplar Bluff, Missouri in 1992 went unsolved, but with the passage of time came the development of technology. Would a used tissue found at the crime scene give police the evidence they needed to crack the case and bring a killer to justice?
