= Murder of Karyn Hearn Slover =

1996 murder of American woman

- Date: September 27, 1996
- Location: Decatur, Illinois
- Cause: Multiple gunshot wounds
- Participants: Jeannette Slover; Michael Slover Sr. Michael Slover Jr.
- Deaths: Karyn Hearn Slover
- Charges: All three: First-degree murder The two Michaels: Concealing a crime
- Verdict: All three, all charges: Guilty
- Convictions: All three: 60 years in prison (murder); The two Michaels: 5 years in prison (concealing a crime)

The murder of Karyn Hearn Slover occurred on September 27, 1996, in Decatur, Illinois, when Karyn Slover, a 23-year-old mother of one, disappeared shortly after leaving her job as an advertising sales representative. Two days later, authorities discovered Slover's dismembered remains, wrapped in plastic bags, in and near Lake Shelbyville.

In 2002, Slover's ex-husband, Michael Slover Jr., his mother Jeannette Slover, and his father Michael Slover Sr. were convicted of Karyn Slover's murder and each sentenced to 60 years in prison. The case is notable for being one of the first instances of dog DNA used as evidence in a murder trial.

== Disappearance, search, and discovery ==
At 5:00 p.m. on September 27, 1996, Karyn Slover left her job in the advertising sales department of the Decatur Herald & Review newspaper, with the intent to pick up her son Kolten and then shop for a dress at the Hickory Point Mall in Forsyth, Illinois. Later that night, a black Pontiac Bonneville was discovered in central Illinois on westbound I-72 with its engine still running, its headlights on, and the driver's side door open. The car was registered to David Swann, Slover's boyfriend, but contained some of Slover's personal effects, including her purse and driver's license. It was initially theorized that Slover could have been the victim of a car-jacking. Investigators did not view her as likely to have voluntarily left the area due to her recently signing with a modeling agency for a job.

On October 1, 1996 the remains of an unidentified female body were discovered in Lake Shelbyville, wrapped in plastic bags that were weighed down with concrete blocks. The remains were confirmed to be those of Karyn Slover through her dental records. Physical evidence, such as a blood droplet and a fingerprint, were recovered from a bridge that overlooked the lake.

== Murder investigation ==
Slover's autopsy revealed that she had been shot seven times in the head, then dismembered with a power saw, before being placed into the plastic bags, which were then sealed using duct tape. Police found several strands of dog hair on the duct tape and remnants of cinders and tall grass. Karen's boyfriend, David Swann, was an early suspect due to an imperfect alibi. Investigators were also suspicious of several actions that Swann had performed during the initial search for Slover and because he owned a handgun matching the type that had been used to shoot her. Swann participated with police during a search and was eventually cleared of suspicion after footage from an ATM surveillance video cleared him for the missing 40 minutes of his alibi. He had forgotten about the trip to the ATM. Alibis for other suspects such as Karen's ex-husband Michael Jr. as well as an ex-boyfriend of hers also ruled them out as suspects.

A break in the case came in 1998, when police noticed that broken concrete at Miracle Motors, a business owned by Slover's ex-father-in-law Michael Slover Sr., were similar to concrete blocks used to weigh down Karyn Slover's body. A forensic geologist was brought in to see if anything on the Slovers' business matched evidence found at the scene of the crime. The geologist found that not only was the concrete consistent with that found at Miracle Motors, but that evidence found in the abandoned car was also likely from the Slovers' business. The task force sifted through dirt at Miracle Motors and eventually discovered a metal rivet that matched Paris Club jeans and a button that matched to a white shirt, both of which Karyn Slover had been wearing the day of her murder. Police also reported finding bones at the scene, but these were not introduced at trial and were believed to have been animal meat bones that came from food fed to two dogs that Slover Sr. used to secure the property.

Police then began to suspect that Michael Slover Sr. and his wife Jeannette had committed the murder over custody issues, as Karyn Slover had expressed interest in moving away to pursue her modelling career and intended to take her son Kolten with her without the father's permission, thus denying him equal parenting rights, while still collecting child support payments. Before arresting the Slovers the investigators had a veterinary geneticist perform a DNA analysis on the animal hairs found on the duct tape, which was matched to hairs retrieved from an animal brush that had been used on the dogs Slover Sr. kept on his business property. The police used this evidence to arrest the Slovers. It was later thrown out due to a court appeal by the Slovers. In January 2000, Michael and Jeannette Slover and their son Michael Slover Jr. were arrested and charged with first degree murder; Michael Sr. and Michael Jr. were each given the additional charge of attempting to conceal a crime. The latter had been confirmed to be at work but he had repeatedly called his parents that day, which made him a suspect in concealing the crime.

== Trial ==
On May 18, 2002, the three Slovers were all found guilty of first-degree murder. They were later sentenced to 60 years in prison, with both Michael Jr. and his father receiving an additional five years for the charge of concealing a crime.

== Custody battle ==
In August 2003, a year after the convictions and seven years after the murder, there were concerns raised over the custody of Karyn Slover's son Kolten, who had been adopted by Mary Slover, Karyn's former sister-in-law. Authorities argued that Mary had been aware of the murder and potentially could have helped conceal the crime. A judge later ruled that Mary was unfit as an adoptive parent and should not retain custody. Mary contested the ruling, which she claimed influenced a case worker to change her report from one which had initially contained a recommendation that Kolten be returned to Mary. Despite this, Mary Slover officially lost custody of Kolten in October 2003. Kolten was later raised by his maternal grandparents, Larry and Donna Hearn, of Mt. Zion, Illinois.

== Appeal ==
The Slovers appealed their murder sentences, stating that media coverage preceding the trial had tainted the potential jury pool and prevented them from receiving a fair trial. Concerns were also raised about other elements such as the animal DNA testing, as well as evidence that the murder could have been committed by one of several alternative suspects. A judge ruled against opening a second trial for the Slovers, stating that he found no evidence of misconduct or prejudice.

Michael Slover Sr. died in June 2022, at age 75. Michael Slover Jr. was released in March 2024. Jeannette Slover died in January 2025, at age 77.

== Illinois Innocence Project ==
The Illinois Innocence Project expressed interest in the Slovers, and conducted an investigation into the case. The group circulated a petition to have the Slovers' case re-examined, while they studied for evidence that the Slovers had not committed Karyn's murder. The group requested that the fingerprint found at the Lake Shelbyville bridge be tested as evidence, but the move was rejected in 2010 by Associate Judge Timothy Steadman, who stated: "Because the latent print is not suitable for the requested testing, there is no potential to produce new evidence materially relevant to the defendants' assertion of actual innocence".

On February 13, 2024, the Illinois Innocence Project filed a petition for post-conviction relief in Macon County Circuit Court, seeking to introduce new DNA evidence that the attorneys argue would exonerate the Slovers. “The new evidence ... has now demonstrated that at least three unknown male perpetrators murdered Karyn Hearn Slover and that Michael Slover Sr., Jeannette Slover and Michael Slover Jr. are innocent,” wrote Innocence Project attorney Leanne Beyer in the 77-page document.

== Media ==
The murder and the subsequent investigation have been the focus of several episodes of investigative true crime shows. The case was examined in a 2006 episode of the truTV television series Forensic Files, the 2005 premiere episode of the Discovery Channel series Guilty or Innocent?, a 2010 episode of the Investigation Discovery show Cold Blood, and in August 2021 it featured in an episode of the Anatomy of Murder podcast series.
