= United States House Oversight Subcommittee on Intergovernmental Affairs =

American legislative committee

The Subcommittee on Intergovernmental Affairs was a subcommittee within the U.S. House of Representatives Oversight and Government Reform Committee. It was dissolved after Democrats regained the House during the 116th Congress.

== Members, 115th Congress ==
Majority	Minority
Gary Palmer, Alabama, Chairman; Glenn Grothman, Wisconsin; Jimmy Duncan, Tennessee; Trey Gowdy, South Carolina; Virginia Foxx, North Carolina; Thomas Massie, Kentucky; Mark Walker, North Carolina	Val Demings, Florida, Ranking Member; Mark DeSaulnier, California; TBA
Ex officio
Trey Gowdy, South Carolina	Elijah Cummings, Maryland
