= ENFORCE the Law Act of 2014 =

American bill

- Long title: To protect the separation of powers in the Constitution of the United States by ensuring that the President takes care that the laws be faithfully executed, and for other purposes.
- Nicknames: Executive Needs to Faithfully Observe and Respect Congressional Enactments of the Law Act of 2014
- Announced in: the 113th United States Congress
- Sponsored by: Rep. Trey Gowdy (R, SC-4)
- Number of co-sponsors: 22

Codification
- U.S.C. sections affected: 28 U.S.C. § 2284, 28 U.S.C. § 2202, 28 U.S.C. § 2201
- Agencies affected: Supreme Court of the United States, Executive Office of the President

Legislative history
- Introduced in the House as H.R. 4138 by Rep. Trey Gowdy (R, SC-4) on March 4, 2014; Committee consideration by United States House Committee on the Judiciary, United States House Judiciary Subcommittee on the Constitution and Civil Justice

The ENFORCE the Law Act of 2014 (H.R. 4138) is a bill that would give the United States House of Representatives and the United States Senate both the standing to sue the President of the United States in a federal district court to clarify a federal law (that is, seek a declaratory judgment) in the event that the executive branch is not enforcing the law. Under the bill, appeals to a court's decisions could be reviewed directly by the United States Supreme Court.

The bill passed in the House of Representatives during the 113th United States Congress.

== Provisions of the bill ==
This summary is based largely on the summary provided by the Congressional Research Service, a public domain source.

The Executive Needs to Faithfully Observe and Respect Congressional Enactments of the Law Act of 2014 or the ENFORCE the Law Act of 2014 would authorize either chamber of Congress, upon adoption of a resolution declaring that the President of the United States or any officer or employee of the United States has established or implemented a policy, practice, or procedure to refrain from enforcing, applying, following, or administering any federal statute, rule, regulation, program, policy, or other law in violation of the constitutional requirement that the President faithfully execute the laws of the United States, to bring a civil action for a declaratory judgment to that effect.

The bill would grant jurisdiction to a three-judge panel of a U.S. district court to hear such civil action and provides for an expedited direct appeal to the United States Supreme Court.

== Congressional Budget Office report ==
This summary is based largely on the summary provided by the Congressional Budget Office, as ordered reported by the House Committee on the Judiciary on March 5, 2014. This is a public domain source.

H.R. 4138 would authorize each chamber (through a resolution or joint resolution) to file a civil action in a federal district court to clarify a federal law (that is, seek a declaratory judgment). Under the bill, appeals to a court's decisions could be reviewed directly by the Supreme Court. The Congressional Budget Office (CBO) estimates that implementing the legislation would have no significant impact on the federal budget because any amounts expended for court costs or litigation could also be spent under current law on similar activities. Enacting H.R. 4138 would not affect direct spending or revenues; therefore, pay-as-you-go procedures do not apply.

H.R. 4138 contains no intergovernmental or private-sector mandates as defined in the Unfunded Mandates Reform Act and would impose no costs on state, local, or tribal governments.

== Procedural history ==
The Executive Needs to Faithfully Observe and Respect Congressional Enactments of the Law Act of 2014 or the ENFORCE the Law Act of 2014 was introduced into the United States House of Representatives on March 4, 2014, by Rep. Trey Gowdy (R, SC-4). The bill was referred to the United States House Committee on the Judiciary and the United States House Judiciary Subcommittee on the Constitution and Civil Justice. On March 7, 2014, it was reported alongside House Report 113-377. On March 7, 2014, House Majority Leader Eric Cantor announced that H.R. 4138 would be considered on March 12 or 13, 2014. On March 12, 2014, the House voted in Roll Call Vote 124 to pass the bill 233–181.

Despite its passage in the House, the bill was not expected to pass in the Senate. On March 12, 2014, President Barack Obama announced that he would veto H.R. 4138 if it was sent to him.

== Debate and discussion ==
House Republicans argued that the bill was necessary because the Obama Administration refused to enforce the laws. The Republicans pointed to changes and delays he'd made with regards to the ACA, his past decisions not to deport children of illegal immigrants, his uneven enforcement of marijuana laws, and his treatment of the Defense of Marriage Act (DOMA) which Republicans often claimed he had refused to enforce. Chairman of the House Judiciary Committee Bob Goodlatte (R-VA) said that "throughout the Obama presidency we have seen a pattern: President Obama circumvents Congress when he doesn't get his way." Majority Leader Eric Cantor said that "the president's dangerous search for expanded powers appears to be endless."

== See also ==
- List of bills in the 113th United States Congress
