= Gartin =

Gartin is a surname. Notable people with the surname include:

- Carroll Gartin (1913–1966), American politician
- Christopher Gartin (born 1968), American actor and producer

== See also ==
- Martin (name)
- Partin
