= Forensic Files season 12 =

Forensic Files
- Season 12
- No. of episodes: 30

Release
- Original network: Court TV (2007 episodes); TruTV (2008 episodes)
- Original release: September 26, 2007 – August 29, 2008

Season chronology
- ← Previous; Season 11 Next → Season 13

Forensic Files is an American documentary-style series which reveals how forensic science is used to solve violent crimes, mysterious accidents, and even outbreaks of illness. The series was broadcast on Court TV, before its rebrand in the middle of the season as TruTV in January 2008, narrated by Peter Thomas, and produced by Medstar Television, in association with TruTV Original Productions. It has broadcast 406 episodes since its debut on TLC in 1996 as Medical Detectives.

== Episodes ==
No. overall	No. in season	Title	Original release date
300	1	"Sharper Image"	September 26, 2007
In 1997, when a young girl was found dead, police quickly arrested the most likely suspect. But cutting-edge technology from NASA enabled a forensic odontologist to prove the wrong man was behind bars. With the killer still on the loose, the investigation was far from over.
301	2	"Insulated Evidence"	October 3, 2007
In 2005, when 21-year-old medical student Michael Andrade is found dead in his fire-damaged San Antonio apartment, police discover fiber evidence that leads to a killer who entered and exited the apartment through a ceiling. The fibers showed someone had entered Michael’s apartment through the building’s shared attic, and further evidence proved that someone was 25-year-old Joe Luna. Luna was convicted of Michael’s murder and was given the death penalty - at his request.
302	3	"Cold Hearted"	October 10, 2007
On January 22, 2001, when a young fireman died from what appeared to be serious but undiagnosed heart disease, his family and friends were devastated but they had no proof of foul play. Then they learned that, six years earlier in a nearby town, a young police officer died in the same way. The men had one thing in common: At the time of their deaths, they were married to the same woman, Lynn Turner.
303	4	"Wheel of Misfortune"	October 24, 2007
Security cameras in a casino tracked a young woman's movements until shortly before she disappeared. She was never seen again, but through the evidence she left behind, she was able to tell investigators what happened to her and who was responsible.
304	5	"Quite a Spectacle"	October 31, 2007
It was one of the most unusual cases in forensic history. Investigators had to find a way to solve a murder case with evidence which consisted of a squashed tomato found at the crime scene, and tiny, pinpoint reflections of light in a photograph. Would it be enough to catch a killer?
305	6	"Transaction Failed"	November 7, 2007
On November 22, 2004, when 58-year-old dedicated, well-respected teacher Diane Tilly disappeared, police had to determine if she had gone on vacation without telling anyone, or if she was the victim of foul play. Investigators turned to forensic science, hoping to find the answers they needed. Security cameras at an ATM as well as forensic evidence in Tilly’s home soon exposed 33-year-old Ronnie Neal and his 15-year-old daughter Pearl Cruz as the killers. Neal and Cruz broke into Diane’s home where they robbed her and Neal raped her, before they abducted and later killed her. Cruz eventually caved and led police to Tilly’s body, and in return, she was sentenced to 30 years in prison, while Neal got the death penalty. Neal committed suicide in 2010.
306	7	"The Day the Music Died"	November 14, 2007
Seattle police had no suspects in the 1993 violent murder of punk-rock singer, Mia Zapata of The Gits. More than a decade would pass before the evidence collected by an extraordinarily prescient medical examiner could be used by forensic scientists to identify the killer.
307	8	"Sole Survivor"	November 19, 2007
A Michigan State University grad student disappeared in 2000 and was presumed dead. With the help of a professor of geological sciences, police hoped to get the "dirt" on her killer.
308	9	"Insignificant Others"	December 10, 2007
How unlucky could one man be? His wife had taken her own life, and his college sweetheart had killed herself in much the same fashion fourteen years earlier. Investigators had to determine if this was a bizarre coincidence, or an attempt to get away with murder twice.
309	10	"Catch 22"	December 17, 2007
On April 30, 1996, 54-year-old Gayle Isleib was ambushed in her Manchester, Connecticut driveway and shot to death. Her second husband, Doug, witnessed the attack but his description of the shooter contained conflicting information. During their investigation, police learned that her 25-year-old co-worker Tyrone Montgomery was in love with her and that she had spurned his advances. They now had to determine if love had turned into obsession and a motive for murder. A search of Montgomery’s home revealed the murder weapon and a disguise kit, which explained the discrepancies in Doug’s testimony. Montgomery’s diary suggested that Doug was the intended target, but Gayle intercepted Montgomery when he got to her house and tried to warn Doug, causing Montgomery to panic and shoot her. Montgomery was convicted of felony murder and sentenced to 65 years in prison.
310	11	"A Cinderella Story"	December 24, 2007
In 1993, 35-year-old Janet Siclari had been sexually assaulted and stabbed to death on the beach, just ten yards from the hotel where she was staying. A pair of men's tennis shoes was discovered near her body. Police were sure that if they found the man who fit the shoes, they would also find the man who committed the crime.
311	12	"Screen Pass"	January 7, 2008
On September 17, 1991, 13-year-old Heather Church went missing from her Colorado home, and the only evidence the kidnapper left behind was three fingerprints on a window screen. After an intense search, Heather’s body was found in the woods. Two years later, a latent print examiner, new to the county and the crime lab, changed the course of the investigation by sharing a little-known fact with his colleagues. This enabled investigators to match the prints on the screen to William Browne, who ultimately pleaded guilty and was sentenced to life without parole.
312	13	"Pressed for Crime"	January 14, 2008
A brutal murder, many suspects, and conflicting evidence but the forensics were clear on one thing: The killer knew his victim. And that alone gave investigators a head start.
313	14	"Finger Pane"	January 21, 2008
A serial killer was on the loose and police had to find him before he struck again. Their most promising lead was an unusual one: a bloody fingerprint on the body of one of the victims.
314	15	"Good as Gold"	January 28, 2008
On Halloween night 2004, Adriane Insogna and Leslie Mazzara were brutally murdered in their Napa, California home. The killer was not seen by their downstairs roommate, but he left his DNA behind in some cigarette butts and a groundbreaking test revealed his race and even the color of his eyes and hair. When this information was made public, Eric Copple went to the police and confessed.
315	16	"Freedom Fighter"	June 13, 2008
After the suspect was convicted of arson and murder, he steadfastly maintained he did not commit the crimes, but he was sentenced to a minimum of 25 years in prison. He had no money, no lawyer, and only a fifth grade education, but he never gave up. He turned to the law books in the prison library and television programs about forensic science, and set out to prove his innocence.
316	17	"Dog Day Afternoon"	February 25, 2008
On June 15, 2004, a woman was brutally murdered in her home, and the only witnesses to the crime were the family dogs. An expert in canine behavior was convinced the killer knew both the victim and the animals, and he was determined find out exactly what the dogs had seen.
317	18	"Shattered Innocence"	March 9, 2008
On November 10, 1998, when 44-year-old defense lawyer Leslie Vaughn was shot and killed in his own bed, the killer probably hoped to cover his tracks by staging the crime scene. But investigators saw through the attempt almost immediately, and they turned to forensic science to learn what really happened that night. Analysis of the 911 call reporting the murder was what obviously led investigators to prove that Vaughn’s 16-year-old son Brian was the killer. Brian and Leslie had been fighting over Brian wanting a new car and jeopardizing his academic career in the process, which is what ultimately led to the murder. Brian Vaughn was tried as an adult and sentenced to 33 years in prison. He was paroled in 2017.
318	19	"All Butt Certain"	March 14, 2008
In 1998, a six-year-old girl ran and hid when she saw her grandmother being beaten to death, but the man followed her, beat her, assaulted her. The girl said he was her uncle Clarence Elkins, and he was convicted because of her identification. She recanted her testimony years later, but the court denied Clarence's petition for a new trial. His wife was convinced he was innocent, and decided to conduct her own investigation to prove it.
319	20	"Jean Pool"	April 18, 2008
In 1984, the body of college student Laura Salmon was found on a Middle Tennessee farm, covered with her own denim jeans as well as the jeans of the killer. Investigators had plenty of suspects, including former boyfriend David Kyle Gilley, but no conclusive evidence linking any of them to the crime. More than a decade later, sophisticated technology would breathe new life into a case grown cold with the passage of time, which would implicate Gilley.
320	21	"Traffic Violations"	May 9, 2008
In 1997, the body of a young woman was found a mile from her abandoned car. Police were especially concerned when they realized the victim had come to them for protection just two weeks earlier, after a road rage incident. Concern turned to dread when the evidence began to point not to an aggressive driver, but to one of their fellow police officers.
321	22	"Brotherly Love"	May 23, 2008
On December 14, 1969, 25-year-old Houston phone operator Diane Maxwell is raped and murdered. Her brother promised he would find out who was responsible and bring the killer to justice. It would take more than thirty years, but the young man kept his promise and, in doing so, brought closure to his family.
322	23	"Disrobed"	June 6, 2008
The crime scene was especially violent: A husband and wife had been shot to death in their bedroom. At first, investigators thought their 16-year-old daughter was lucky to have escaped unharmed, but after a while, they wondered if the reason she was alive had more to do with careful planning than good fortune. Based on the murders of Diane and Alan Scott Johnson.
323	24	"Driven to Silence"	June 20, 2008
In 1995, 27-year-old Dana Satterfield was sexually assaulted and murdered in her own beauty salon. The evidence at the crime scene did not match any of the suspects and, after the initial investigation, the case went cold for ten years. Then a witness who had been silent for more than a decade decided to do the right thing. (Note: The prosecutor featured in this episode, Trey Gowdy, would later become a United States Congressman.)
324	25	"Printed Proof"	June 28, 2008
In 1995, when two women went missing and were later found brutally murdered, police wondered if they were victims of a hate crime; the women lived together and were politically active, outspoken advocates of gay rights. But the motive turned out to be something age old, something with which investigators were all too familiar: greed, fueled by obsession.
325	26	"About Face"	July 18, 2008
A human skeleton was discovered in the North Carolina marshlands and, when investigators learned she had been dead for 18 months, they knew it would be difficult to find out who she was, much less who killed her. A forensic anthropologist was able to determine the victim's race, age and height, but it would take an inventive computer consultant to give her a face and a name.
326	27	"In the Bag"	July 25, 2008
On March 27, 2003, after shooting Jack Myers, 51, and his second wife Linda, 55, the killer staged the scene, placed the incriminating evidence into a plastic bag and tossed it into the river. Instead of floating downstream, it became entangled in overhanging branches. Days later, when police found it, they hoped clues to the killer's identity and the solution to the crime were "in the bag". Eventually, they tied the evidence back to Jack’s younger son, 26-year-old Gregg, who was deep in debt and had been refused financial aid by his father. Store receipts and the gun’s serial number were all prosecutors needed to make their case. Gregg Myers was convicted of aggravated murder and was sentenced to two life terms.
327	28	"Yes, In Deed"	August 8, 2008
In a tragic twist of fate, just days after the woman sold her home and moved to a modest trailer, a fire took both the trailer and her life. But the autopsy proved this was no accident; it was arson and murder. Investigators had to determine who wanted the woman dead and why.
328	29	"Guarded Secrets"	August 22, 2008
In 1991, a security guard disappeared from his post without a trace; his remains were found a year later in a remote camp site. More than a decade would pass before a phone call breathed life into the cold case, and a paint smear on the bottom of the victim's boot helped scientists determine what happened during the last hour of his life.
329	30	"Smoking Out a Killer"	August 29, 2008
On August 18, 1981, Susan Schumake, a senior college student, was found raped and murdered near an unpaved footpath used by students to walk from one side of the Southern Illinois University Carbondale campus to the other. Five years earlier, a student was assaulted and killed in her off-campus apartment and, a year after that, another student was killed in almost the same way. Police feared a serial killer was on the loose and they needed to determine what – or who – these women had in common.
