= Forensic Files season 14 =

Forensic Files
- Season 14

Release
- Original network: truTV
- Original release: September 10, 2010 – June 17, 2011

Season chronology
- ← Previous; Season 13 Next → Season 1 (Forensic Files II)

Forensic Files is an American documentary-style series which reveals how forensic science is used to solve violent crimes, mysterious accidents, and even outbreaks of illness. The show is broadcast on truTV, narrated by Peter Thomas, and produced by Medstar Television, in association with truTV Original Productions. It broadcast a total of 406 episodes, starting in 1996 with four seasons on TLC, as Medical Detectives.

This was the final season of the series, airing its last episode, "Expert Witness", on June 17, 2011. Series executive producer Paul Dowling once ruled out the possibility of reviving the series, as he considered series narrator Peter Thomas, who died on April 30, 2016, irreplaceable. The series was revived in 2020 as Forensic Files II.

== Episodes ==
No. overall	No. in season	Title	Original release date
380	1	"Purebread Murder"	September 10, 2010
On September 4, 2000, Christina Sanoubane was murdered in her Cedar Rapids, Iowa apartment after moving away from her abusive boyfriend. There are clues at the scene: bloody footprints and DNA from the victim's rape kit. But, the evidence that conclusively tied her neighbor Carlos Robinson to the crime was on a freshly baked hamburger bun.
381	2	"Hear No Evil"	September 24, 2010
In 2006, Darlene VanderGiesen received threatening emails and then disappeared. Tracking the source of the emails led police to the home of Daphne Wright, where they believe a murder was committed. The evidence is overwhelming and investigators are sure they have enough proof to convict Wright. What they don't have is the body of the victim.
382	3	"Hell's Kitchen"	October 8, 2010
In 2000, Kristine Fitzhugh failed to show up for her music class and her husband Ken found her dead at the bottom of the stairs of their Palo Alto, California home. Upon further investigation, luminol reveals evidence of murder in the kitchen. As detectives investigate the crime further, they uncover a long-held family secret that provides motive.
383	4	"Three's a Crowd"	October 22, 2010
On October 28, 1999, Susan Fassett was gunned down as she left church choir practice in Poughkeepsie, NY. Her husband Jeff became the prime suspect, particularly when police learned he found out just a month earlier that his wife had been cheating on him for three years. Once her husband Jeff was cleared by police, he pointed to Fred Andros who was the man she was having the affair with. Fred then pointed to Dawn Silvernail, another of Fred's lovers.
384	5	"A Squire's Riches"	November 5, 2010
On February 23, 2008, emergency response came upon a garage fire and a man was found crushed beneath a truck in Arlington Heights, Illinois. Upon first glance, the victim was the homeowner Ari Squire. Investigators turned to forensic science to determine if they were dealing with a tragic accident or a carefully orchestrated murder. With the discovery that Ari had recently hired a Home Depot employee named Justin Newman, who had disappeared, the case focused on the search for Newman. Note: A law enforcement official in this case was influenced to pursue further investigation after watching season 8 episode "Past Lives", regarding an earlier insurance fraudster who used a pre-existing cadaver (rather than committing murder) to fake his own death.
385	6	"Home of the Brave"	November 19, 2010
In 2007, the Florida mobile home of Effie and Michael Ratley catches fire and Michael heroically rescues his wife and infant son. A month later, his wife is found beaten to death in a bedroom of his parents' home. The cut window screen points to an intruder, but the lack of supporting evidence compels investigators to look within.
386	7	"Freeze Framed"	December 3, 2010
In 2005, David Castor suffered a slow, agonizing death over a period of days. His wife Stacey maintained it was suicide, even though it was done with antifreeze. Police were skeptical, especially when they learned Stacey's first husband Michael Wallace died when he was only 38 years old and she refused to consent to an autopsy.
387	8	"Touch of Evil"	December 17, 2010
In the 1990s, the media dubbed Richard Rogers the "Last Call Killer" because he targeted men in gay bars who were obviously intoxicated. His methods involved dismembering the bodies and wrapping the parts in plastic bags, which he then carefully washed to remove all incriminating evidence. He eluded capture for almost ten years and then new technology revealed fingerprints no one knew were there.
388	9	"Textbook Murder"	December 31, 2010
On November 29, 2006, Jackson, Mississippi resident Avis Banks and her unborn child were brutally murdered in her garage and was discovered by her fiancé Keyon Pittman. Police learn Pittman was having affairs with other women and he became the prime suspect. That is, until a man came forward who not only believed he owned the murder weapon but that he also knew who used it. Their focus then turns to Carla Hughes, Pittman's co-worker and lover.
389	10	"Filtered Out"	January 14, 2011
On January 25, 2000, when teenager Tara Munsey goes missing after a work shift at a Radford, Virginia restaurant, it is unknown if she ran away or if she was the victim of foul play. Everyone's worst fears are confirmed when a body is found at the bottom of an isolated ravine. Investigators scoured the crime scene, hoping to find enough evidence to identify the killer. But, information from her friends and an informant directs police to Jeff Thomas, a man who had previously known Tara.
390	11	"Water Logged"	January 28, 2011
On June 4, 1989, the dead bodies of Joan Rogers and her two teenage daughters were found floating in Tampa Bay. The water washed away any evidence, but police hoped a handwritten note found in the victims' car would lead to the killer, so they posted huge copies of the note on five highway billboards. By doing this, they received a call from a woman, for whom Oba Chandler had done work, and they positively identified his handwriting, as well as a palm print left on the note.
391	12	"Social Circle"	February 11, 2011
On July 18, 2003, Tiffany Rowell and three of her friends were brutally murdered in their affluent Clear Lake, Texas neighborhood and the crime scene yielded little evidence. The next-door neighbors had seen two young people dressed in black walking nearby and their descriptions were used to create composite drawings, which become a key element in solving the crime. Eventually, an anonymous tip pointed police to a former friend of three of the victims named Christine Paolilla and her former boyfriend, Christopher Lee Snider.
392	13	"Low Maintenance"	February 25, 2011
On April 9, 2008, college co-ed Jenna Verhaalen was found dead in her Bryan, Texas apartment and petechial hemorrhages in her eyes indicated that she was strangled. The victim's boyfriend, a neighbor and the apartment maintenance man Jeremy Rosser are all suspected, but it takes DNA evidence to identify the killer.
393	14	"Fate Date"	March 11, 2011
On February 22, 2003, Rebecca Barney and her soon-to-be ex-husband Fred were found shot to death in their Tulsa, Oklahoma home, which had been set on fire. After the fire was extinguished, Kenneth Maxwell, who was the man who had called 911 to report the fire, was also found shot dead in his car. Only the computer had been taken from the Barney home and with it, seemingly the means to identify the killer. But, further investigation of Rebecca's online life led them to James "Jimmy" Kidwell.
394	15	"Trail of a Killer"	March 25, 2011
On May 13, 2003, Kathy Loreck was murdered on a Concord, California jogging trail in the middle of the day while talking to her husband on her mobile phone. The leads from Kathy's cell phone records and search dogs go nowhere. Nine days later, a witness tells police about a chance encounter and cigarette butts contained the killer's DNA, which was eventually linked to Robert Ward Frazier.
395	16	"Gone Ballistic"	April 8, 2011
On June 10, 2008, real estate developer Alan Helmick was found shot to death at home by his wife Miriam in Grand Junction, Colorado. Police have a wealth of evidence against her, but it is circumstantial. The case will turn on a .25 caliber bullet fired 20 years ago from the now-missing murder weapon.
396	17	"Seeing Red"	April 22, 2011
On September 13, 2005, the body of young mother Summer Baldwin was found in a suitcase in a Texas landfill. The suitcase leads investigators to Rosendo Rodriguez and the forensic evidence against him was formidable. Upon a search of his computer, authorities discover that Rodriguez had been following the news surrounding teenager Joanna Rogers, who had gone missing in 2004. Upon extensive search of the same landfill, Rogers' decomposing body was also found in a suitcase.
397	18	"Auto-Motive"	May 6, 2011
On September 11, 2001, Michelle Harris went missing from her Owego, New York home. Since they were going through a contentious divorce, her husband Cal was a suspect, as well as several other men that Michele had been in contact with before her disappearance. But, no arrests were made until one of the men made an incriminating remark.
398	19	"Skeleton Key"	May 20, 2011
On May 27, 2004, nursing student Tamika Huston went missing from her Spartanburg, South Carolina home. A tip led detectives to her car and they find an unknown house key that could help solve the case. A locksmith links the key to some public housing and upon extensive investigation, police found Christopher Hampton, a man Huston had been dating at the time of her disappearance. In 2005, her remains were found and shortly thereafter Hampton was arrested and charged with her murder.
399	20	"Funeral Services"	June 3, 2011
On November 2, 2002, funeral director Lonnie Turner, Sr. was found shot to death in his Navasota, Texas home. His son Lonnie Jr. became the prime suspect, particularly after it was discovered that the murder was committed with his gun. However, he had an alibi for the time of the murder. Later, detectives found a mask near the crime scene and DNA evidence led them to Turner's godson James David White.
400	21	"Expert Witness"	June 17, 2011
On May 1, 1993, young mother Tammy Tatum was found sexually assaulted and murdered in her Longmont, Colorado apartment. Police initially suspected her estranged husband, but did not have enough evidence to charge him and the case went cold. Three years later, another young woman was raped and police suspect the cases may be related, but the DNA collected provides no answers. Years later, Rudy Gaytan is required to give a DNA sample upon leaving prison and his DNA links him to the rape. Eventually, he also confesses to the murder of Tammy Tatum.
