= Lucious Boyd =

American murderer on death row

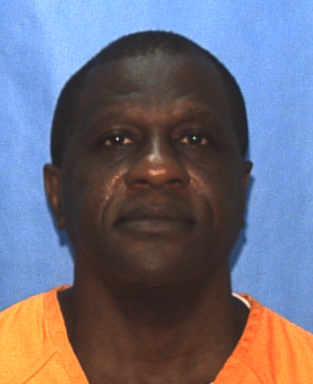
- FDOC mugshot
- Born: March 22, 1959 (age 67); Broward County, Florida, U.S.
- Status: Incarcerated
- Convictions: First degree murder; Kidnapping; Sexual battery
- Penalty: Death (June 21, 2002)

Details
- Victims: 1 conviction, 5–10 suspected
- Span of crimes: 1993–1999
- Country: United States
- State: Florida
- Date apprehended: March 26, 1999
- Imprisoned at: Union Correctional Institution, Union County, Florida

Lucious Boyd (born March 22, 1959) is an American convicted murderer, rapist, and suspected serial killer who is currently on death row in Florida. Boyd was sentenced to death for the 1998 rape and murder of 21-year-old Dawnia Dacosta and is a suspect in at least ten other homicides and disappearances. He was acquitted of the 1993 murder of a man whom he claimed he stabbed in self-defense. He was profiled on Forensic Files.

He is currently incarcerated in Union Correctional Institution. In 2023, Boyd was linked through DNA profiling to the unsolved murder of Eileen Truppner, who he raped and murdered in December 1998, only two weeks after he murdered Dacosta.

== Background ==
Boyd was born on March 22, 1959, in Broward County, Florida. His family owns a funeral home in Fort Lauderdale. Prior to 1998, Boyd had been married twice and was the father of at least eight children. He had been sued by four separate women for failing to pay child support.

Prior to 1998, Boyd was struggling financially and had to stay at his family's home in Plantation for periods of time. In 1996, his father, James C. Boyd, who was the owner of the family funeral home, died. In 1998, Boyd worked as a handyman for Hope Outreach Ministries. According to Boyd's family, he had an ongoing cocaine problem.

== Crimes ==
In 1990, Boyd choked his second wife, Julie McCormick, to the point of unconsciousness. McCormick had threatened to leave him for cheating on her. A felony charge of aggravated battery was brought against Boyd but was later reduced to a misdemeanor charge meaning Boyd was only given probation. In 1992, Boyd was accused of raping a girl during a date on her 18th birthday. No charges were filed however because the victim declined to prosecute.

On October 18, 1993, Boyd stabbed Roderick Bullard to death on a Fort Lauderdale street with a kitchen knife during an argument over an automobile. Bullard was the brother of one of Boyd's girlfriends. Boyd told police that Bullard had hit him and that he "just lost it." He admitted that Bullard had no weapon and never threatened him. During the trial, Boyd's defense attorneys turned the tables on Bullard, playing up the fact that he had cocaine in his bloodstream. The jury called Boyd's actions self-defense and acquitted him of the killing.

== Possible murders ==
Police believe Boyd is responsible for a number of unsolved murders, the sexual assaults of several women, and the disappearance of 25-year-old Danielle Zacot from Fort Lauderdale, Florida, in 1999.

On August 13, 1997, the naked body of 24-year-old Melissa Floyd was found in some high grass near a guardrail on I95 in Palm Beach County. She had been stabbed multiple times and was not positively identified until four months later. Floyd was known to use drugs near the Boyd family funeral home and her ID card was discovered by Boyd's family members on the funeral home grounds a few weeks after Floyd's body was found. However, there was no physical evidence linking Boyd to the crime.

On February 16, 1998, 20-year-old Gina Marie Moore was found deceased near a canal along Beeline Highway in Palm Beach County. She was nude and had possibly been asphyxiated. According to Moore's sister, Boyd's DNA was found on her body.

On June 28, 1998, 19-year-old Patrece Alston was seen getting into a green Mazda with Boyd. The two were supposedly going on a trip to Winter Haven nearly 200 miles away. Boyd returned the next day without Alston, who has not been seen since. Boyd told the cops that witnesses could verify that Alston had also returned from the trip, but those witnesses later denied having seen her. Investigators are convinced that Boyd knows where Alston's body is located.

== Murder of Dawnia Dacosta ==
Dawnia Hope Dacosta was a 21-year-old choir singer and student, studying to become a pediatric nurse practitioner. On the evening of December 4, 1998, Dacosta left work at 10 p.m. and went to church where she prayed until 1 a.m. the following morning. On her way home from church, her car ran out of gas on Interstate 95. Dacosta walked to a nearby Texaco station, where a witness spotted her, noting that she looked scared. Behind Dacosta was a church van with the word "Hope" printed on the side. Dacosta was seen getting inside the van and a black male was seen behind the wheel, later identified as Boyd.

Sometime after getting into the van, Boyd struck her across the head. He took her back to his apartment, raped her, beat her and stabbed her thirty-six times with a screwdriver. Her body, wrapped in sheets and a plastic shower curtain, was dumped in an alley behind a warehouse in Oakland Park and was not discovered until December 7.

Detectives from the Broward County Sheriff's Office began their investigation into Dacosta's murder by looking for the van. It was not spotted until January 30, 1999, where it was seen in front of a Christian day care center in Lauderhill. The van's owner, Reverend Frank Lloyd, was interviewed on March 22, 1999. Lloyd ran Hope Outreach Ministries and employed Boyd as his handyman. He told police Boyd had used the van from December 4 to December 7.

On March 25, 1999, a sample of Boyd's DNA came back from the crime lab as a match to the semen found on Dacosta's body. The next day, Boyd was arrested.

== Trial ==
Boyd claimed he was suffering with memory lapses during his interviews about the murder of Dacosta. He was called a "cold-blooded killer without a conscience," by an interviewing detective and was told he would be going to jail for raping and killing Dacosta. Boyd then reportedly asked, "What took you so long to catch me?". He then demanded an attorney.

After Boyd was arrested, detectives searched his apartment and recovered blood that was later found to be Dacosta's. Two sheets that had been wrapped around the victim's body were identified as having disappeared from his apartment. Before he was sent to jail, Boyd accused the Broward County Sheriff's Office of working for the Ku Klux Klan and claimed he was being set up in an attempt to discredit his family.

Boyd was eventually found guilty of Dacosta's murder and was sentenced to death on June 21, 2002. He is currently on death row awaiting execution and is incarcerated in the Union Correctional Institution.

== Link to unsolved murder ==
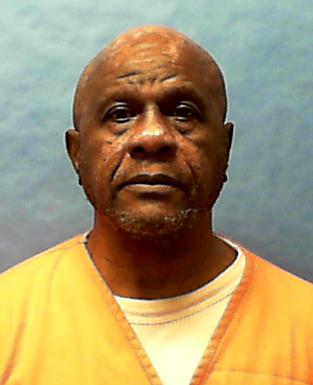
Lucious Boyd in 2023

In 2023, Boyd was linked to the unsolved murder of Eileen Truppner through DNA profiling. Truppner, who remained a Jane Doe for nearly twenty-five years, was a 41-year-old mother of two children and a Puerto Rico native who moved to South Florida in the mid-90s. On December 18, 1998, Boyd raped Truppner and strangled her to death. He then dragged her body into the sawgrass in a remote area off U.S. Route 27, north of Interstate 75. A boater found Truppner's body the next day and she had been dumped lying face down. Evidence showed she had been strangled and raped.

Truppner's identity remained a mystery for over two decades and she was listed as a Jane Doe. In October 2022, detectives with the Broward County Sheriff's Office released a new sketch of Truppner and spotlighted the murder as part of a series highlighting cold cases in Broward County. In May 2023, after months of detective work and analysis of DNA samples from Truppner's surviving relatives, the Jane Doe was officially identified as Eileen Truppner. In December 2023, Boyd was linked to her killing and was indicted.

== In popular culture ==
Dacosta's murder and the events leading to Boyd's arrest and conviction were documented on an episode of the TV series Forensic Files called "Church Dis-service". The Dacosta murder case was also featured on ID Network's Riding with the Devil, which premiered in September 2024. Dawnia's murder was also featured in season 1, episode 4 of the series “Man with a Van” on ID Network, which premiered in 2020 entitled “Lucifer”.

== See also ==
- Capital punishment in Florida
- List of death row inmates in the United States § Florida
- List of serial killers in the United States
