= Phillup Partin =

American murderer (born 1965)

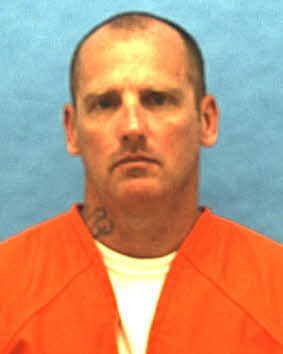
- mugshot of Partin
- Born: June 29, 1965 (age 61); Sacramento, California, U.S.
- Other name: Sonny Partin
- Height: 5 ft 6 in (168 cm)
- Children: 1
- Status: Incarcerated at Union Correctional Institution
- Convictions: First degree murder Second degree murder Robbery; Burglary
- Penalty: Death; commuted to life imprisonment

Details
- Victims: Gary Thorne; Joshan Ashbrook
- Date: October 7, 1987 (Thorne murder); July 31, 2002 (Ashbrook murder)

Phillup Alan "Sonny" Partin (born June 29, 1965, in Sacramento, California) is an American convicted murderer currently serving life in prison without parole in Florida at Union Correctional Institution. Partin was sentenced to death by a 9–3 vote in favor of the sentence by a jury on December 1, 2008, for the July 31, 2002, murder of 16-year-old hitchhiker Joshan Ashbrook. Partin was resentenced to life in prison without parole in 2024.

== Murder ==
Evidence at Partin's trial showed that he picked up Ashbrook as she hitchhiked along U.S. Highway 19 in Florida on July 31, 2002. He and Ashbrook spent the day fishing and swimming with Partin's daughter Patrisha, then 6, before returning to the New Port Richey house where he and his daughter were living. Prosecutors stated their belief that Ashbrook was killed between 9 p.m. and midnight. The next morning, workers found her body in woods off Shady Hills Road. She had been strangled, her throat gashed and her neck broken. Nine days after the discovery, Partin dropped Patrisha off at the home of a foster mother, Jean Prestridge, later known as Jean Edenfield, in Wauchula and left the state. Patrisha's two sisters lived with this foster mother in her Wauchula home. Jean kept Patrisha for five days but then gave her up to foster care. He was a fugitive for more than a year before investigators tracked him to Fayetteville, North Carolina. He was arrested there on October 28, 2003.

== Background ==
Partin was a prostitute with male clients. Partin was convicted of second-degree murder in Florida after he killed one of his clients, Gary Thorne, a math teacher from Key Biscayne. Thorne was strangled with a telephone cord in his home. He was convicted of second-degree murder, armed robbery and armed burglary in 1989 and sentenced to 17 years in prison. Partin was released from prison on August 1, 1995. He then worked in construction and had a daughter, Patrisha Windham (born c. 1996), with Martha Windham. He had sole custody of his daughter prior to Ashbrook's death.

== See also ==
- List of death row inmates in the United States
