= Cold Case Files =

Reality legal show/documentary television series

- Created by: Kurtis Productions, Ltd.
- Starring: Bill Kurtis; Danny Glover
- Country of origin: United States
- No. of episodes: 168

Production
- Executive producers: Laura Fleury; Ari Mark; Phil Lott; Jason Blum; James P. Axiotis
- Running time: About 45–50 minutes
- Production companies: Kurtis Productions, Ltd. Blumhouse Television; AMPLE Entertainment

Original release
- Network: A&E
- Release: January 1, 1999 – March 7, 2025

Cold Case Files is a reality legal show/documentary on the cable channel A&E Network and a rebooted series. It is hosted by Bill Kurtis and the original series produced by Tom Golden. The show documents the investigation of many long-unsolved murders (referred to as "cold cases" in detectives' parlance) through the use of modern forensic science (especially recent advances in DNA techniques), and criminal psychology, in addition to recent breakthroughs in the case(s) involving previously silent witnesses.

On January 19, 2017, Blumhouse Television, AMPLE Entertainment and A&E revived the series for a ten-episode run. The well received reboot features highly cinematic recreations and music. The new episodes first began airing on February 27, 2017. Actor Danny Glover took over for Kurtis as narrator for this new 10-episode series. Kurtis later returned. On August 20, 2021, after a four-year hiatus, the series returned with a new season on A&E, again with Kurtis as the host.

== Overview ==
According to A&E, the show has been widely praised by law enforcement agencies, and its investigative reports are commonly used in the training of detectives. Cold Case Files first aired as a sub-series of another A&E crime documentary program, Investigative Reports, also hosted by Bill Kurtis, which ran from 1991 to 2011. Reruns of the original 1997 series currently air on broadcast syndication in the United States, usually in lower-profile time slots, and on many RTV stations.

The Blumhouse Television, AMPLE Entertainment reboot aired its first episode on A&E on February 27, 2017. The complete first season was streamed on Hulu on January 1, 2018, and later on Netflix on September 15, 2019. Some episodes of the series have now been adapted into a podcast of the same name, Cold Case Files, hosted by Brooke Gittings and featuring the voice of the original Cold Case Files host, Bill Kurtis. The podcast is part of the PodcastOne podcast network in conjunction with A&E.

== Episode list ==
=== Season 1 (1999) ===
No. overall	No. in season	Title	Original release date
1	1	"Hour 1"	January 1, 1999
"A Fingerprint and a Prayer": The murder of Felicia Prechtl by Karl Chamberlain "My Brother the Killer" "Murder of Bob Crane" "Verdict Reversed"
2	2	"The Boy and the Monster Secret in the Cellar"	January 8, 1999
"The Boy and the Monster": The murder of Doris Ann McLeod. "Secret in the Cellar": The murder of Pearl Bruns.
3	3	"The Texas Drifter The Fingerprint File 'Rose' Among Thorns"	January 15, 1999
"The Texas Drifter": Rapist Lester Don Parks. "The Fingerprint File": The murder of Beverly Eller. "Rose Among Thorns": The murder of Juliet Rowe.
4	4	"The Answer in the Box Maternal Instinct"	January 23, 1999
"The Answer in the Box": The murder of Alison Parrott. "Maternal Instinct": The murders of Seth and Tegan Davis by their mother Marybeth Davis.
5	5	"The Hunter Homicides The Skulls Of Stanley Park"	January 29, 1999
"The Hunter Homicides": The murders of Don Hill and Gregory Allan Wood "The Skulls Of Stanley Park": Skulls are found in 1953 belonging to then-unidentified boys in Stanley Park; in the 1990s, another two skulls, belonging to Ramsey Rioux and Kenneth Lutz, were found in Stanley Park.
6	6	"Through Eyes of a Child The Killer Next Door"	February 6, 1999
"Through Eyes of a Child": The murder of Michelle Morgan. "The Killer Next Door": Serial killer John Rodney McRae.
7	7	"One Night on the Bayou The Buckeye Misdemeanor"	February 12, 1999
"One Night on the Bayou": The murder of Lester B. Hansen. "The Buckeye Misdemeanor": The murder of Dale Sechrist.
8	8	"The Mark of Cain Death on the Freeway"	February 19, 1999
"The Mark of Cain": The murder of James McCutcheon. "Death on the Freeway": The murder of police office George Arthur.
9	9	"Terror in Telluride Signature of a Killer"	February 26, 1999
"Terror in Telluride": The murder of Eva Schoen. "Signature of a Killer": The murder of Taylor Courtney by Larry Gibson.
10	10	"Diary of a Serial Arsonist The Lost Clue"	March 3, 1999
"Diary of a Serial Arsonist": Serial arsonist John Leonard Orr. "The Lost Clue": The murder of Carmen Torres by Billy Bob Sutherland.
11	11	"Killer on the Strip The Doll Murder"	March 12, 1999
"Killer on the Strip": The murder of Lucie Pate. "The Doll Murder": The murder of Susan Doll.
12	12	"Murder Illustrated Blood Relations"	March 19, 1999
"Murder Illustrated": The murder of Peggy Hettrick. "Blood Relations": The murder of Kimberly Marie Kuntz.
13	13	"Justice Delayed The Burning Secret"	March 26, 1999
"Justice Delayed": Serial rapist Reginald Miller. "The Burning Secret": The murders of Donald Morris and Christopher Styles.
14	14	"Reconstructing Murder Fire Flicks"	April 9, 1999
"Reconstructing Murder": The murder of Mwivano Mwambashi Kupaza. "Fire Flicks": The story of two unnamed juvenile arsonists.
15	15	"The Missing Informant Man's Best Friend"	April 30, 1999
"The Missing Informant": The murder of ATF informant Christine Elkins. "Man's Best Friend": The murder of Daniel Schraeder.
16	16	"Killer in the County"	April 16, 1999
"Killer in the County": Serial killer Faryion Wardrip.
17	17	"Presumed Dead The Tow Truck Killer"	April 23, 1999
"Presumed Dead": The murder of Tracy Jo Shine. "The Tow Truck Killer": The murder of Deputy Sheriff William D. Simmons.
18	18	"Portrait of a Killer The Tortured Truth"	April 30, 1999
"Portrait of a Killer": The investigation into the 1974 disappearance of Michelle Wallace is aided by NecroSearch, who finally identifies Roy Melanson as the perpatrator. "The Tortured Truth"
19	19	"Vanished"	May 7, 1999
"Vanished": The murders of Jennie Hicks, Jerilyn Towers, and Lynn Willette by James R. Hicks
20	20	"The Missing and the Dead"	May 14, 1999
The murder of Jean Marie "Annie" McLeod Tahan
21	21	"Silent Witness Innocence Lost"	May 21, 1999
"Silent Witness": The murder of Dr. Helena Margaret Greenwood. "Innocence Lost": The South Bay Rapist – Billy Lee Mayshack.
22	22	"Frozen in Time Little Girl Lost"	May 28, 1999
"Frozen in Time": The murder of Denise Anette Huber. "Little Girl Lost": The murder of Holly Lee Blake.
23	23	"Family Secret Blood Trail"	June 4, 1999
"Family Secret": The murder of a New Jersey police officer, Charles Bernoskie. "Blood Trail": The murder of Roger Scott Dunn.
24	24	"Bodies in the Bay Till Death Do Us Part"	June 11, 1999
"Bodies In The Bay": The murders of Joan "Jo" Rogers and her two daughters. "Till Death Do Us Part": The murders of Sharon Reeves and Emilita Reeves.

=== Season 2 (2000) ===
No. overall	No. in season	Title	Original release date
25	1	"Operation Jambalaya Footprints in the Snow"	January 1, 2000
"Operation Jambalaya": A New Orleans police officer solves the murder of Marilyn Allen at Camp Pendleton. "Footprints in the Snow": the murder of Thomas "Tommy" Bolchen.
26	2	"The South Side Rapist"	January 8, 2000
Dennis Rabbitt
27	3	"Mark of a Killer Dead Ends"	January 15, 2000
"Mark of a Killer": Suspected serial killer Alfred Swinton is convicted of murdering Carla Terry via bite marks on her body. "Dead Ends": Murder of 18-year-old Jamie Ellen Weiss by soon-to-be husband, Billy Justin Charles.
28	4	"The Baiting Game"	January 22, 2000
Murder of Jerry McClendon in Henry County, Virginia.
29	5	"Ticket to Nowhere The Paper Route"	January 29, 2000
"Ticket to Nowhere": The murder of Diane Chorba "The Paper Route": The murder of Bertha Neaman
30	6	"Traces of Murder The Bathtub Killer"	February 5, 2000
"Traces of Murder": The murder of Enrique Elizarbe "The Bathtub Killer": The murders of Michelle LaFond and Dina Kichler
31	7	"Pride and the Fall The Nail File"	February 12, 2000
"Pride and the Fall": Serial killer Robert Spangler "The Nail File": The infamous 1984 Roy Rogers Restaurant slaying of Terri Brooks
32	8	"In the Care of a Killer Deadly Lies"	February 19, 2000
"In the Care of a Killer": Babysitter Tawny Sue Gunter is suspected of killing a toddler, Billy Deon Blankenship, III, in 1990 after a second child, Mariah Lynn Sisco, dies in her care in 1998. "Deadly Lies": James Kent Hill is convicted of killing Frank Ross in 1986, after Ross's body was found in a lake.
33	9	"Lady in the Box"	February 26, 2000
The murders Betty Fran Gladden Smith, Janice Hartman, and one unknown victim
34	10	"Crimes of the KKK"	March 5, 2000
The murders of Vernon Dahmer and Willie Edwards
35	11	"Murder on the Menu"	March 12, 2000
The murders of Alice, Susie, Wayne, and Patti Huling, Marlys Wohlenhaus, and Diane Edwards.
36	12	"The Widow and the Wolf Unicorns and Alligators"	March 19, 2000
"The Widow and the Wolf": A woman suspects that her boyfriend murdered her aunt, Gertrude McCabe, in 1983. "Unicorns and Alligators": Joseph Kondro is suspected of killing 8-year-old Rima Traxler in 1985 and 12-year-old Kara Patricia Rudd in 1996.
37	13	"Vintage Murder Trouble in Paradise"	March 26, 2000
"Vintage Murder": Dawn Magyar is found raped and shot to death in 1973. "Trouble in Paradise": The murder of Pegye Jann Bechler
38	14	"The Perfect Murder Death of the Innocents"	April 2, 2000
"The Perfect Murder": The murder of Kay Sybers "Death of the Innocents": The remains of two infants born to Susan Connell are found in an abandoned mobile home.
39	15	"The Unluckiest Man The Deadly Triangle"	April 9, 2000
"The Unluckiest Man": Serial arsonist John Veysey murdered his wife, Patricia DeBruyne Kemp Veysey. "The Deadly Triangle": The murder of Walter Brown
40	16	"Cat and Mouse Final Fare"	April 16, 2000
"Cat and Mouse": The murder of Alma Nappier "Final Fare": The murder of cabbie John Orner
41	17	"The Cuff Link Graveyard Shift"	April 23, 2000
"The Cuff Link": The murder of Jeanette Kirby by David Draheim "Graveyard Shift": The murder of Tracy Benge Sewell
42	18	"The Good Samaritan Gun Shy"	April 30, 2000
"The Good Samaritan": The murder of Horst Eppenbach, Sr. "Gun Shy": The murder of Abby Niebauer
43	19	"A Map To Murder Life on the Run"	May 7, 2000
"A Map To Murder": Serial killer Maury Travis "Life on the Run":Richard Gordon Bannister
44	20	"Soft Kill Unsolved"	May 14, 2000
"Soft Kill": Richard Evonitz is sought in connection of the rape and murders of multiple underage girls. "Unsolved": The story of the unsolved abduction and murder of Cindy Wanner in 1991.
45	21	"License To Kill The Tell-Tale Mark The Supermarket Mystery"	May 21, 2000
"License To Kill": The murders of Doreen Moorby and Helen Ferguson "The Tell-Tale Mark": The murder of Amado Hermosillo "The Supermarket Mystery": The murder of Mary Lloyd
46	22	"The Original Night Stalker"	May 28, 2000
The then-unsolved "Golden State Killer" case
47	23	"Cold Hit Silent Kill"	June 4, 2000
"Cold Hit":Jeffrey Gorton "Silent Kill": Murder of Beatrice Bellis in Port Hueneme, California
48	24	"Mommy's Rules"	June 11, 2000
Theresa Knorr is suspected in the murders of two of her daughters, and her third daughter finally convinces police to reopen two cold cases.
49	25	"A Sealed Fate Deadly Divorce"	June 18, 2000
"A Sealed Fate": Clyde Carl Wilkerson is convicted of murder as DNA links him to two 37-year-old cold cases. "Deadly Divorce": Larry Britt is finally convicted of murdering his ex-wife 24 years earlier after DNA from blood found in his truck is matched to her.

=== Season 3 (2001) ===
No. overall	No. in season	Title	Original release date
50	1	"Cop Killer Evil Twin"	January 1, 2001
"Cop Killer": Gerald Mason "Evil Twin": An identical twin is a suspected murderer.
51	2	"The Zodiac Killer"	January 8, 2001
52	3	"The Accidental Killer Little Sister Lost"	January 15, 2001
On June 10, 1975, Leslee Larson is hiking through Wolf Creek, Montana with her husband, Dennis Larson. A short two hours later, Dennis Larson is asking for help from other Montana locals, claiming that his wife has fallen into the creek.
53	4	"The Merry Widow The Bad Cop"	January 22, 2001
"The Merry Widow" describes how a woman arranges the murder of her husband to obtain insurance money. "The Bad Cop" covers an attempt by a former state trooper to disguise a murder as a suicide.
54	5	"Daddy Knows Best Dawn of the Dead"	January 29, 2001
"Daddy Knows Best": Murder of Marlene Oakes "Dawn of the Dead": Murder of Steven Paul in San Jose, California.
55	6	"The Killer's Tattoo"	February 5, 2001
The murder of John Dobbs
56	7	"The Green River Killer"	February 12, 2001
57	8	"A Hitchhike to Murder Never Forgotten"	February 19, 2001
"A Hitchhike to Murder". "Never Forgotten"
58	9	"The DNA Link The Secret Slide"	February 26, 2001
"The DNA Link": Patrick Baxter "The Secret Slide":Murder of Melissa Bittler in Portland, Oregon.
59	10	"Death Before I Do Hollywood Homicide"	March 5, 2001
"Death Before I Do": After being tipped to the police by his fiancé, Michael Schultz is convicted for raping and strangling Cindy Berger. "Hollywood Homicide": After almost getting away with two murders, Kenneth Dean Hunt is convicted of raping and killing two elderly women, Myra Davis and Jean Orloff, 10 years apart.
60	11	"Blood Money Precious Doe"	March 12, 2001
"Blood Money": Testimony about larvae growth helps solve a murder case. "Precious Doe"
61	12	"Unholy Bible A Daughter's Justice"	March 19, 2001
"Unholy Bible": Danny Bible "A Daughter's Justice"
62	13	"Officer Down Secret Twin"	March 26, 2001
"Officer Down" "Secret Twin"
63	14	"Weepy-Voiced Killer/The Mr. Big Sting"	April 2, 2001
Minneapolis police search for a murderer who calls 911 and leaves weepy-voiced confessions.
64	15	"Blood on the Badge Bump in the Night"	April 9, 2001
"Blood on the Badge": Murder of James Richard Greene "Bump in the Night": Murder of Aimee Willard
65	16	"The Lady Killer A Husband's Secret"	April 16, 2001
"The Lady Killer":Murder of Ruth Masters in Myles Standish State Forest "A Husband's Secret":Murder of Barbara Jane Gallagher in Centralia, Missouri.
66	17	"Mistaken for a Killer A Woman Scorned"	April 23, 2001
"Mistaken for a Killer" "A Woman Scorned"
67	18	"The Missing Hunters The Flashlight Rapist"	April 30, 2001
"The Missing Hunters": David Tyll and Brian Ognjan vanished after failing to return from a hunting trip in 1985.
68	19	"Cowboys on the Case Office Politics"	May 7, 2001
"Cowboys on the Case": Four retired lawmen (nicknamed the "Cold Case Cowboys") trace a rendezvous with murder with the help of a convict. A rape-robbery in Lookingglass, Oregon was solved when one of the perps bragged about his involvement, but his partner disappeared—for 23 years!
69	20	"The Flaming Gorge Falls Caught in the Mail"	May 14, 2001
"The Flaming Gorge Falls": A man is suspected of killing his family by pushing them off a cliff in 1996. "Caught in the Mail": A 13-year-old girl is murdered in Seattle in 1982 and DNA on an envelope may lead to her killer.
70	21	"Murder Checks In Killer in the City"	May 21, 2001
"Murder Checks In": Three women raped and killed in Iowa hotels. Police have a prime suspect in the serial killer case: Donald Piper. "Killer in the City": A frightened Bronx woman is stabbed 39 times, but the suspect claims self-defense.
71	22	"The Shopping Cart Killer"	May 28, 2001
New York denizen Arohn Kee is a lesser known serial killer, but no less odious. He preyed on teenage girls in Harlem.
72	23	"The Hitmakers Favor for a Friend"	June 4, 2001
"The Hitmakers": Murder of Kevin Hughes in Nashville, Tennessee "Favor for a Friend": Murder of Raymond Demel in Salinas, California.
73	24	"Lil Miss Skeletons in the Closet"	June 11, 2001
"Lil Miss" "Skeletons in the Closet"
74	25	"Innocent Prey The Punishment"	June 18, 2001
"Innocent Prey" "The Punishment"

=== Season 4 (2002) ===
No. overall	No. in season	Title	Original release date
75	1	"Love Triangle 2nd Story Rapist"	January 1, 2002
"Love Triangle" "2nd Story Rapist": A California district attorney uses an unprecedented legal strategy—a "John Doe" warrant—to solve a rape case.
76	2	"The Calling Card Carol's Diary"	January 8, 2002
"The Calling Card": Donald Sigsbee is convicted of killing Regina Reynolds after accidentally leaving his business card near the scene of her body. "Carol's Diary": 16-year-old Carol Hutto's homicide is a cold case for over 20 years until James Kuenn confesses under the threat of DNA evidence.
77	3	"Beauty Queen Killer The Fingerprint"	January 15, 2002
78	4	"Friend of the Family Remains of Murder"	January 22, 2002
"Friend of the Family": After 18 years, Manny Pacheco is convicted of murdering his 11-year-old friend, Angela Wong. "Remains of Murder": James Crummel reports finding the remains of 13-year-old Jamey Trotter during a hike, and six years later police arrest him for abducting, molesting, and murdering Jamie 15 years earlier.
79	5	"Under a Spell Justice for Lisa"	January 29, 2002
"Under a Spell": Francisco del Junco confesses to killing and torching four homeless women. "Justice for Lisa": After 23 years, Stephen Robert Smith confesses to killing 6-year-old Lisa after DNA links him to the murder.
80	6	"A Man Scorned The Dungeon"	February 5, 2002
"A Man Scorned": Archie Talley is convicted of murdering Elizabeth Herrington, after seeing her with his ex-lover. "The Dungeon": John Jamelske kidnapped multiple women and held them in a concrete bunker behind his home.
81	7	"A Killer Named Korn The Night Watchman"	February 12, 2002
"A Killer Named Korn": Donald Korn is convicted of the 1974 rape and murder of Mildred Ruth Doench, and the assault and rape of Dorothy Hendren in 1975. "The Night Watchman": Security guard Dimas Garcia is murdered by a local car thief, Steven Peace.
82	8	"The Bedroom Basher"	February 19, 2002
A serial killer is suspected of killing five women in Orange County, California in 1978 and 1979, and of another crime that a man was falsely convicted of.
83	9	"Baby for Sale The Barrel"	February 26, 2002
84	10	"The Bitemark Justice for Eglena"	March 5, 2002
"The Bitemark": Forensic dentistry is the key to solving a teen's murder, using a photo of a bite mark on the arm of child killer Wayne Garrison. "Justice for Eglena": 15-year-old Eglena Deleon is murdered by Guadalupe Sandoval less than a block from a Diez y Seis de Septiembre celebration.
85	11	"Sex, Lies and Murder"	March 12, 2002
The episode describes the investigations that lead to the arrest of John Edward Robinson, the "Internet slave master".
86	12	"The Monster A Cousin's Promise"	March 19, 2002
"The Monster": Charles Vines is caught raping a 16-year-old, and his DNA links him to the rape and murders of two elderly women. "A Cousin's Promise": Darlene Hines's murderer, James Mertini, is only sentenced to five years in prison.
87	13	"A Brother's Burden The Midnight Attacker"	March 26, 2002
88	14	"The Well The Deadly Ex"	April 2, 2002
"The Well": An elderly man is murdered and tossed into his well in 1996, and his stolen guns lead to his killers. "The Deadly Ex": When a young mother's body is found beaten to death in her car's trunk in October 1988, her ex-husband is suspected of the crime.
89	15	"Déjà Vu Secret in the Well"	April 9, 2002
"Déjà Vu" "Secret in the Well"
90	16	"The Tourniquet Burning Desire"	April 16, 2002
"The Tourniquet": The murders by Anthony Allen Shore. "Burning Desire": After being linked by fingerprints to the death of Andrea Born, Kevin Mitchell points a finger at his friend, J. L. Travis, as the murderer.
91	17	"Manhunt"	April 23, 2002
92	18	"The Family The Clue That Stuck"	April 30, 2002
"The Family": A Mexican crime family is suspected of a teen girl's murder "The Clue That Stuck"
93	19	"Man in the Shadows The Hitchhiker"	May 7, 2002
"Man in the Shadows" "The Hitchhiker"
94	20	"A Confession for Carmen The Girls"	May 14, 2002
"A Confession for Carmen" "The Girls"
95	21	"A Sister Lost Rumors of Murder"	May 21, 2002
"A Sister Lost": The murder of Lizabeth Wilson at 1974 in Prairie Village, Kansas. "Rumors of Murder": Murder of Julie Hill in Duluth, Minnesota
96	22	"Smoky Mountain Mystery A Drop of Blood"	May 28, 2002
"Smoky Mountain Mystery": In April 1979, 41-year-old Harriet Simmons heads to Nashville for a weekend road trip. Eleven months later in Buncombe County the Sheriff's Office finds her skeletal remains. "A Drop of Blood": Terry Hyatt
97	23	"Rear Window The Peeper"	June 4, 2002
"Rear Window": A 23-year-old fails to show up for work, and police find her body. A suspect emerges, but getting a DNA sample requires finesse. "The Peeper": A neighborhood with a peeping Tom is shocked when a man is murdered and assaulted. Clues include DNA and a footprint. Fourteen years later the assailant is caught during another 'peep' job.
98	24	"The Closers Caught by an Eyelash"	June 11, 2002
"The Closers": Edmund Marr is suspected of killing Elaine Graham, but isn't convicted until 22 years later. "Caught by an Eyelash": James Suknaich is connected to the murder of prostitute Kiva Bible by a single eyelash found on Bible's sock.
99	25	"Kidnapped"	June 18, 2002
The parents of Chad Choice, a missing 8-year-old boy in Tyler, Texas, receive a grisly package containing his skull.

=== Season 5 (2005–06) ===
No. overall	No. in season	Title	Original release date
100	1	"Obsession: Dave Reichert and the Green River Killer"	December 15, 2005
One of the most prolific serial killers in U.S. history, dubbed "The Green River Killer," confessed to murdering dozens of women in the Seattle area. Dave Reichert had reopened the case after being elected sheriff and succeeded in solving the case thanks to scientific advances.
101	2	"Finding BTK"	December 22, 2005
A special on the BTK Killer who murdered 10 people in Wichita, Kansas between 1974 and 1990.
102	3	"Death of a Deacon A Wife's Mission"	January 14, 2006
"Death of a Deacon": A deacon suspected of having an affair is found shot to death in Tijuana. "A Wife's Mission": A woman claims she was assaulted by the man that killed her husband.
103	4	"Snatched A Detective's Promise"	January 21, 2006
"Snatched": Murder of Corinne Gustavson in Edmonton. "A Detective's Promise": Murder of Camilla Randall in Crescent City, California.
104	5	"The Sunday Morning Slasher"	February 4, 2006
Police in Michigan hope to link Carl Watts to two murders in 1974 and 1979 before he is released from a Texas prison.
105	6	"Caught on Tape A Son Remembers"	February 11, 2006
106	7	"On the Case: Nacole's Killer"	February 18, 2006
Atlanta police detectives attempt to solve the 1995 rape and murder of Nacole Smith.
107	8	"Killer on Campus The Bow Hunter"	April 2, 2006
"Killer on Campus": A college student is murdered in a cemetery in 1969. "The Bow Hunter": A hunter is murdered in 1993.
108	9	"Something Snapped A Killer's Dream"	April 7, 2006
109	10	"Daddy Dearest A Pastor's Wife"	May 6, 2006
"Daddy Dearest": Estanislao Gonzalez is convicted nine years after murdering his wife and two teenage daughters. "A Pastor's Wife": Pastor Rick Pulley convicted of killing his wife after scratches on his body connect him with her disappearance.
110	11	"A Killer's Skin Where's Peggy?"	June 3, 2006
"A Killer's Skin": Violent serial killer Raymon McGill is convicted of over a dozen rape-murders spanning over a decade, after accidentally leaving skin cells at the site of a robbery. After he is convicted, police discover there may be an accomplice. "Where's Peggy": Peggy Reome's body is found in a storage unit in Clay, New York, 14 years after she was reported missing.
111	12	"Innocence Stolen Danger at the Door"	July 8, 2006
"Danger at the Door": Laura Arroyo
112	13	"The Interrogation The Slide"	July 15, 2006
113	14	"The Taunt Death in Deadwood"	July 29, 2006
"The Taunt": A rapist/murderer's taunting postcard provides DNA to identify him. "Death in Deadwood": Deadwood, South Dakota uses the FBI fingerprint database to locate "Outlaw," an elusive hippie who bashed David Rose to death with a 70-pound boulder in 1982.
114	15	"On the Case: A Child Remembers"	August 12, 2006
One detective checks into a rapist/murderer's background, which includes the death of an 11-year-old girl and photos of children. The detective finds out if there are more than the victims the killer has been convicted of. The same detective meanwhile reopens an unsolved domestic killing which ends with the uniting of siblings who didn't know each other existed.
115	16	"The Black Dahlia"	September 9, 2006
The 1947 murder of actress Elizabeth Short, the oldest unsolved case in L.A.
116	17	"The Deadly Stroll Unholy Secret"	September 23, 2006
117	18	"A Deadly Affair The Sting Operation"	September 30, 2006
"A Deadly Affair" leads to a dead husband in Olathe, Kansas, unsolved for over 20 years. "The Sting Operation" catches a drugstore robber who killed an officer in Beebe, Arkansas.
118	19	"NCIS Exhuming the Truth"	October 7, 2006
"NCIS": Federal agents reopen the 1968 disappearance of a navy ensign who was labeled a deserter. "Exhuming the Truth": An Illinois college student is raped and murdered in 1981.
119	20	"Cross Country Connection Eyes at the Window"	October 21, 2006
DNA links sexual assaults in Florida to a woman murdered in California in 1988.
120	21	"Abandoned Houses A Son's Memory"	October 28, 2006
121	22	"A Knock at the Door Shattered"	November 18, 2006
122	23	"A Deadly Pattern A Desperate Housewife"	November 18, 2006
123	24	"Murder He Wrote Caught by the Past"	October 21, 2006
A Michigan taxi company owner is murdered outside his home in 1989.
124	25	"Evidence Kit"	October 28, 2006
125	26	"Left for Dead On the Case"	November 18, 2006
"Left for Dead": Fingerprints on a beer bottle connect two suspects, Andre Robinson and Adrian Sutherland, to the murder of a prostitute, Pamela Shelley. "On the Case": Two Kansas City police detectives solve the separate homicides of Linda Winfield and John Sehanchuk using DNA evidence.

=== Season 6 (2017) ===
No.	Title	Original air date
1 (126)	"Little Girl Lost"	February 27, 2017
Halloween in a small town is cancelled indefinitely when a young girl named Shauna Howe is kidnapped and killed on her way home from a costume party. Note: First appearance of Danny Glover as narrator.
2 (127)	"Killings on Christmas Eve"	March 6, 2017
The Cold Case of Minnie and Ed Maurin who were murdered on Christmas Eve in 1985.
3 (128)	"She Never Came Home"	March 13, 2017
The case of a gruesome stabbing death of a bullied teenager, Tina Faelz, remains unsolved for 27 years.
4 (129)	"Sweethearts, Silenced"	March 16, 2017
High School Sweethearts Tim Hack and Kelly Drew (both 19) are reported missing after a night of dancing in Wisconsin. Their bodies are found days later in the woods.
5 (130)	"A Family Cursed"	March 20, 2017
Two unsolved murders of loved ones, Zilphia Lowery and Jeremiah Pittman, plague a family; detectives uncover a hidden crime scene that may help solve the 13-year-old cold case.
6 (131)	"The Night Shift"	May 25, 2017
College student Brad Perry shows up to work his graveyard shift at the gas station and is never seen alive again.
7 (132)	"Officer Down"	June 1, 2017
The murder of Sheriff's Lt. Joe Clark was the longest-running cold case in the United States involving a law enforcement officer.
8 (133)	"Circle of Friends"	June 8, 2017
When 18-year-old Shannon Siders' body is found in the woods, everyone in the small town of Newaygo, Michigan, becomes a suspect—but no one is convicted of the crime.
9 (134)	"A Family Secret"	June 15, 2017
A 17-year-old girl, Jessica Dishon, from a small Kentucky town goes missing, then is found strangled two weeks later; a police investigation into the crime uncovers a terrible family secret.
10 (135)	"A Killer Slips Away"	June 29, 2017
Two decades after a close-knit family's loving aunt, Anna Mae Florence, is stabbed in her home, detectives return to the crime scene and discover a pivotal clue hidden in plain view.

=== Season 7 (2021) ===
No. overall	No. in season	Title	Original release date
136	1	"The Voice in the Lake"	August 21, 2021
The 2000 murder of 31-year-old real estate appraiser Mike Williams in the Florida swamps
137	2	"Devil at the Door"	August 27, 2021
The murder of 36-year-old computer programmer Lisa Valdez.
138	3	"Missing in Altoona"	September 3, 2021
The 1999 murder of Sherry Leighty
139	4	"The School Teacher"	September 10, 2021
The 1992 murder of 25-year-old schoolteacher Christy Mirack
140	5	"The Heartland Killer"	September 17, 2021
Crimes committed by serial killer Timothy Krajcir
141	6	"The Devil in Disguise"	September 24, 2021
The Murder of Irene Garza in 1960.
142	7	"Love and Hate"	January 7, 2022
The murder of Timothy Coggins in 1983
143	8	"Ice Cold in Denver"	January 7, 2022
The murder of radio intern Helen Pruzsynski in 1980.
144	9	"Murder by Moonlight"	January 14, 2022
The murder of Lisa Ziegert in 1992.
145	10	"Suspicious Minds"	January 14, 2022
The murder of 15-year-old Ressa Trexler in 1984
146	11	"A Lesson in Homicide"	January 21, 2022
The murder of schoolteacher Jonelle Melton in 2009
147	12	"Woman in the Woods"	January 21, 2022
The murder of Jody Loomis in 1972
148	13	"Eyes of a Killer"	February 4, 2022
The murder of Michael Temple, Jr. in 2010
149	14	"Dark Angel"	February 11, 2022
The murder of Pam Pitts in Arizona 1988
150	15	"Friday Night Ghosts"	February 18, 2022
The murders of five people who were abducted from a KFC restaurant in 1983
151	16	"The Clock Strikes Murder"	February 25, 2022
The murder of 23-year-old Tonya McKinley in 1985
152	17	"Sisters in Death"	March 4, 2022
The murder of Jack Kennedy's daughters in 1984
153	18	"One Tough Mother"	March 11, 2022
The murder of 19-year-old Tiffany Johnstone in July 1997 and the subsequent arrest of William Lewis Reece.
154	19	"Written in Blood"	March 18, 2022
The murder of Loretta Jones in 1970
155	20	"Cold Ashes"	March 25, 2022
The murder of a couple in 1999, who were found burned in their home, and subsequent disappearance of two teenage girls
156	21	"Queen of the Ozarks"	April 1, 2022
The murder of a 20-year-old "Sucker Day" festival queen in June 1985
157	22	"The Bone Keeper"	April 8, 2022
The murder of teen David Reed in December 1985
158	23	"A is for Arson"	April 15, 2022
The murder of firefighter Gary Parks, which was originally ruled an arson death
159	24	"'Til Death Do Us Part"	April 22, 2022
The 1981 murder of Cheryl Hall, whose body was discovered by her husband Chuck
160	25	"The Lost Patient"	April 29, 2022
The 1979 disappearance and subsequent murder of Janie Landers, a mental patient
161	26	"Missing and Murdered"	May 6, 2022
The murder of Cree woman Shirley Soosay in 1980
162	27	"Sole Survivor"	May 13, 2022
The murder of the Bennett Family in 1984. The sole survivor is three-year-old Vanessa.

=== Season 8 (2022) ===
No. overall	No. in season	Title	Original release date
163	1	"Killer in the Storm"	August 21, 2022
The murder of Brenda DuPont in Opelousas, Louisiana in May 1988
164	2	"Gone in a New York Minute"	August 27, 2022
The disappearance of Queens landlord Bruce Blackwood in March 2006
165	3	"Murder in the Midwest"	September 3, 2022
The 1974 murder of Lori Nesson in Reynoldsburg, Ohio.
166	4	"The Death of a Hero"	September 10, 2022
The January 2007 murder of World War II vet Bennie Angelo, whose death was initially ruled an arson as his body was found in a burning home
167	5	"Vanished in Virginia"	September 17, 2022
The 1995 murder of 30-year-old army lieutenant Lisa Gaudenzi in Richmond, Virginia
168	6	"Taken in Tacoma"	September 24, 2022
The 1986 murder of 13-year-old Jennifer Bastian in Tacoma, Washington

=== Season 9 (2024–2025) ===
The first ten episodes were made available to stream on Hulu on January 11, 2024. The episodes were later broadcast on A&E beginning with "Money Moguls and Murder" on November 15, 2024.

No. overall	No. in season	Title	Original release date
169	1	"A Killer Confession"	January 11, 2024
In 1993, the town of Redding, California is rocked by the disappearance of Frank McAlister, who only leaves behind a blood-stained car. 25 years will pass before someone makes a stunning on-air confession.
170	2	"Good Girl Gone"	January 11, 2024
When 19-year-old Tara Sidarovich goes missing from her Punta Gorda, Florida home in 2002, police consider her a runaway. Then her body turns up in a swamp. Shocking prison recordings will send detectives on a nationwide hunt for her killer.
171	3	"Who Killed My Father"	January 11, 2024
In 1974, 34-year-old Freddie Farah is gunned down in his Jacksonville, Florida grocery store, police urgently seek his killer. Four decades later, Farah's son will have a chance encounter with a cold case detective which brings the case back to life and exposes a killer.
172	4	"Damn His Soul to Hell"	January 11, 2024
The 1964 murder of 9-year-old Marise Chiverella leaves the town of Hazleton, Pennsylvania in fear. An intense manhunt yields numerous suspects but no killer. Five decades pass before a student moonlighting as a genetic genealogist reignites the case.
173	5	"Money, Moguls and Murder"	January 11, 2024
In 1977, 23-year-old nurse Deborah Clark is found brutally killed in her Coral Gables, Florida home. Detectives unearth an affair, a jilted wife, and a web of money and power, but no true suspect. It will take 40 years and advanced DNA testing to expose her killer.
174	6	"Evil in Huntington Beach"	January 11, 2024
When the body of a woman turns up in a field in Huntington Beach, California in 1968, police simultaneously seek a killer and the identity of the victim herself. It takes 52 years for detectives to solve this dual mystery and expose a vicious predator.
175	7	"The Smoking Gun"	January 11, 2024
A 2007 cold case resurfaces when a detective reopens the investigation into the brutal killing of 20-year-old Audrey Giannotti, in Laureldale, Pennsylvania. Uncovering hidden secrets, he races against time to bring justice to a family desperate for answers.
176	8	"A Bullet to the Heart"	January 11, 2024
When 36-year-old night manager Rodney Castin is gunned down in the lobby of his hotel in 2000, detectives scour Marietta, Georgia for his killer. Almost two decades pass before an informant's shocking testimony breaks the case wide open.
177	9	"Viciously Murdered"	January 11, 2024
When 22-year-old Susan Schwarz is found shot to death in her Lynnwood, Washington apartment in 1979, police suspect a robbery gone wrong. 32 years pass before a witness reveals a much darker motive that breaks the case wide open and leads to her killer.
178	10	"Death of a Baseball Mom"	January 11, 2024
When beloved mother and sister Janora Stevens is found brutally stabbed in her Tulsa, Oklahoma home in 1987, her family is bitterly divided and increasingly suspicious of each other. The case chills until a trail of tell-tale fibers leads cops to her killer.
179	11	"Sooner State Nightmare"	December 27, 2024
A massive search unfolds in Chandler, Oklahoma when two women and a child go missing from a parking lot in 1992. It will take 23 years and a tip from an unlikely source to piece together a heinous plot of misdirection and murder.
180	12	"Blood Red Snow"	January 24, 2025
When 19 year-old Chris Green is found beaten to death near Bangor, Michigan in 2002, his family fear their son's murder will never be solved. Years pass before shocking revelations from an informant emerge and blow the case wide open.
181	13	"The Evil Among Us"	January 31, 2025
When 8-year-old April Tinsley is found dead in a Fort Wayne, Indiana ditch, the community is shaken. Disturbing letters then appear, penned by her killer, targeting other young girls. Police scramble to catch April's murderer before he strikes again.
182	14	"No Known Enemies"	February 7, 2025
When 81-year-old Helen Gale is found in her burned-out car, investigators of Southfield, Michigan wonder who would murder this pillar of the community. It will be eight years before a blown alibi brings them face-to face with her killer.
183	15	"Contracted to Kill"	February 21, 2025
When 37-year-old Lee Rotatori is found dead in her hotel room in 1982 with a single stab wound to the heart, police suspect the work of a professional. It will take four decades to identify her killer and, in the process, reveal a shocking truth.
184	16	"A Dawn to Remember"	February 28, 2025
When 18-year-old Dawn Koons heads to Bakersfield, California with dreams of stardom, her family back in Yonkers, New York worry she's made a mistake. When her body is found in her bathtub police have a suspect but unmasking her killer takes nearly 40 years.
185	17	"The Campfire Mint Murder"	March 7, 2025
When 9-year-old Candy Rogers turns up dead after selling mints door-to-door, Spokane, Washington detectives launch a dogged campaign to find her killer. What follows is one of the longest Cold Case investigations in the State history.

== Specials ==
=== Cold Case Files: The Rifkin Murders (2023) ===
No. overall	No. in season	Title	Original release date
1	1	"Part 1"	September 30, 2023
Documents the real-time cold case investigation into the two unidentified victims of Joel Rifkin, the most prolific serial killer in New York State history.
1	2	"Part 2"	September 30, 2023

=== Cold Case Files: The Grim Sleeper (2024) ===
No. overall	No. in season	Title	Original release date
1	1	"Part 1"	November 8, 2024
Explores the crimes of elusive serial killer Lonnie Franklin who preyed on vulnerable women over a span of 25 years. Narrated by Regina Hall.
1	2	"Part 2"	November 8, 2024

== Spin-off series ==
=== Cold Case Files: DNA Speaks (2023) ===
No. overall	No. in season	Title	Original release date
1	1	"A Fatal Path"	August 17, 2023
When 14-year-old Nacole Smith is brutally murdered in 1995 on a wooded path in Atlanta, the police and community rally around her mother as she seeks justice. It will take decades and a second brutal assault to finally reveal her killer.
2	2	"A Deadly Heist"	August 17, 2023
When 26-yeard old Minerva Cantu is found lifeless in her Lake Worth, Florida home, police suspect robbery as the motive. But who killed this mother as her infant slept in the next room is a mystery that would haunt one detective for 20 years.
3	3	"Horror in the Dark"	August 17, 2023
When teens Llianna Adank and Eric Goldstrand are found shot to death at a Eugene, Oregon park in 1977, every parent's nightmare comes true. Detectives doggedly pursue leads for 40 years.
4	4	"Justice for Mary"	August 17, 2023
23-year-old Mary Scott is found murdered in her San Diego home in 1969. A case with few leads quickly loses steam. Years later, Mary's daughters grow determined to find answers.
5	5	"Fought Like Hell"	August 17, 2023
In 1982, the blood-smeared car of 27-year-old Stefanie Watson was found in a Laurel, Maryland parking lot. Her family hold out hope she's still alive. When a jawbone is dumped in a neighborhood, a missing person's investigation becomes a murder.
6	6	"A Deadly Premonition"	August 17, 2023
When 31-year-old Linda Slaten is strangled in her Lakeland, Florida, home, a complex web of suspects emerges. The 1981 case takes a dramatic turn when a DNA hit exposes the sinister underbelly of a seemingly peaceful community.
7	7	"Killed for the Cash"	August 17, 2023
In 2002, 58-year-old gas store owner Subir Chatterjee was shot inside his check cashing booth. With the murderer's DNA in hand, one detective refuses to retire until the case is solved.
8	8	"Deadly Web of Lies"	August 17, 2023
When 47-year-old Scott Martinez is found murdered in his La Mesa, California home, investigators can't tell who is telling the truth within his inner circle. It takes 13 years and an advance in DNA analysis to find his killer.
9	9	"Death Downstream"	August 17, 2023
In 1993, the battered body of 16-year-old Shawna Yandell was found floating in a river near Yakima, Washington. Detectives first suspect those closest to her. The case grew cold until new DNA technology revealed a callous killer that no one suspected.
10	10	"Death of a Yellow Rose"	August 17, 2023
When 30-year-old Susan Woods is found drowned in her tub in Stephenville, Texas, suspicion falls on her estranged husband. With a suspect's DNA in hand, detectives go back to the basics to unmask a killer cowboy living in plain sight.

=== Cold Case Files: Murder in the Bayou (2025) ===
The spin-off series is narrated by Keith David.

No. overall	No. in season	Title	Original release date
1	1	"A Trinity River Murder"	December 27, 2024
When 13-year-old Krystal Jean Baker is found dead beneath a bridge in Texas City, Texas investigators are stumped. The quest to track down her killer will take investigators 14 years, and lead to a new law.
2	2	"The Devil in Hammond"	January 3, 2025
When a young mother, 26-year-old Selonia Reed is found brutally murdered in her car, detectives turn over every rock around Hammond, Louisiana in search of her killer. Selonia's case languishes for more than 30 years before justice is finally served.
3	3	"Lost Soul in Lafayette"	January 10, 2025
In 2008, the body of free-spirited Bonnie Ruphard is discovered by a jogger in a wooded area of Lafayette, Louisiana. The case sits for a decade until DNA places a sprawling Bayou family under the microscope for her murder.
4	4	"Horror in Starkville Mississippi"	January 17, 2025
When Betty Jones and Kathryn Crigler are brutally attacked in a 1990 home invasion, the tiny community of Starkville, Mississippi, is left living in fear. Decades pass and a detective devotes himself to cracking the case using new technology.
5	5	"Evil in Cajun Country"	January 24, 2025
The town of Alexandria, Louisiana is rocked when the body of 19-year-old Courtney Coco is found dumped 200 miles away in Winnie, Texas. The case cools until a retired homicide detective, turned podcaster, discovers her killer hiding in plain sight.
6	6	"Monster in Bayou Pigeon"	January 31, 2025
In 1991, 29-year-old Curtis "Cochise" Smith, heads out for diapers in Plaquemine, Louisiana and vanishes. 25 later, a body surfaces in the bayou and his murder case reignites. A local with a long rap sheet becomes the prime suspect.

=== Cold Case Files: Dead West (2025) ===
The spin-off series is narrated by Dude Walker.

No. overall	No. in season	Title	Original release date
1	1	"Mystery in Cuero"	February 21, 2025
In 2001, 31-year-old Pam Shelly is found in her Cuero, Texas bathroom with a fatal gunshot wound to the head. Her death is initially ruled a suicide. Yet a tenacious investigator's instincts and his suspicion of foul play eventually cracks the case wide open.
2	2	"Thou Shalt Not Kill"	February 28, 2025
When 52-year-old Dan Lavigne is shot dead on his porch in Rapelje, Montana, 2002, deputies find no shortage of suspects. What follows is an 8-year quest for justice that stretches across three states before police finally unmask his killer.
3	3	"Rocky Mountain Murder"	March 7, 2025
In 2005, 43-year-old Carolyn Jansen is found dead, stuffed into a duct-taped container in Aurora, Colorado. Forensics and a fearless DA will finally reveal her murderer after years.
4	4	"Murder in the City of Saints"	March 14, 2025
When beloved 64-year-old Sherry Black is murdered in her rare-books store in Salt Lake City, investigators suspect theft as the motive. The case goes cold until her daughter teams with a wily investigator to bring her killer to justice.
5	5	"Lovers, Lies and Canyon Murder"	March 21, 2025
In 1987 28-year-old Carol Murphy is found dead in a wooded area of Boulder, Colorado. It will take 20 years and a new technology to finally solve her murder.
6	6	"The Death of Lavender Doe"	March 28, 2025
When a woman's burning body is found in an oil field in 2006, the rural community of Kilgore, Texas and a determined lawman do everything to solve her case. It takes 13 years to ID Lavender Doe and nab her callous killer.

== Accolades ==
Emmy Award:

- Outstanding Nonfiction Series (2005) nomination: Michael Harvey (executive producer), Laura Fleury (executive producer), Tania Lindsay (supervising producer), Michael West (supervising producer), Mary Frances O'Conner (producer), Bill Kurtis (host)
- Outstanding Nonfiction Series (2004) nomination: Laura Fleury (executive producer), Michael Harvey (supervising producer), Mike West (producer), Bill Kurtis (host)

Online Film & Television Association Awards:

- Best Informational Program (2007) – nomination

== See also ==
- Solved, USA / ID, 2008 (true cases)
- Cold Justice, USA / TNT, 2013 (true cases)
- To Catch a Killer, CAN / OWN, 2014 (true cases)
