= Mary Morgan =

Mary Morgan may refer to:

- Jaye P. Morgan or Mary Margaret Morgan (1931–2026), American popular music singer, actress and game show panelist
- Mary Morgan (British murderer) (1788–1805), Welsh servant convicted for killing her newborn child
- Mary C. Morgan (fl. 1960s–2020s), judge of the San Francisco County Superior Court and the first openly lesbian judge appointed in the United States
- Mary Jane Morgan (1823–1885), American art collector and wife of Charles Morgan
- Mary "Rae" Morgan, convicted of the 1961 manslaughter of her step-daughter Michele LeAnn Morgan
- Mary Sherman Morgan (1921–2004), American rocket fuel scientist
- Mary S. Morgan (born 1952), professor of the history of economics in the London School of Economics
- Mary DeNeale Morgan (1868–1948), American painter
- Mary Kimball Morgan (1861–1948), American educator

== See also ==
- Mary De Morgan (1850–1907), British author of literary fairytales
- Mary Morgan-Grenville, 11th Lady Kinloss (1852–1944), British peeress
- Mary Morgan-Richards (fl. 1990s–2020s), New Zealand biologist
