= James P. Axiotis =

American producer and director (1963–2026)

Background information
- Born: James Photi Axiotis; June 4, 1963; Athens, Greece
- Died: October 18, 2026 (aged 63) Charlotte, North Carolina, U.S.
- Occupations: Executive producer, director and writer
- Years active: 1981–2026

James Photi Axiotis (June 4, 1963 – October 18, 2026) was an American film and television producer, director and writer who is known for his work on The Bridges of Madison County, The Puppet Master, Hell's Kitchen, and Cold Case Files.

== Early life and career ==
Axiotis was born in Athens, Greece. He was adopted by Greek Americans and the family moved to Southern California.

After graduating, Axiotis started working as an executive producer and director. He has worked on a multitude of feature films and TV shows, including The Bridges of Madison County, Marriage Boot Camp, Reality Stars, The Postman Always Rings Twice, The Puppet Master, Hell's Kitchen, America's Most Wanted, Cold Case Files, Table for One and NBC Nightly News.

He served in the capacity of Vice President of Post-production and Post-Producer at AT&T/Audience Network. He was in his second term serving on the National Board of directors for the Producers Guild of America and a member of the Producers Guild of Europe, Academy of Television Arts & Sciences, American Film Institute, Greek American Foundation, and Order of AHEPA.

Before his death, Axiotis was in pre production of his short film Georgia. A short film based on the life of his birth mother before he was adopted. The script for the short film was announced as a winner at the Saronikos International Festival of Creative Arts which is based in Greece. The script was also selected as an Official Selection at the Greece International Film Festival.

== Personal life and death ==
Axiotis has three daughters, Anna, Sophia, and Georgia. He had previously been married twice.

Axiotis died in Charlotte, North Carolina, on October 18, 2026, at the age of 63.

== Filmography ==
- The Bridges of Madison County
- The Puppet Master
- 365 Days of Love
- The Postman Always Rings Twice
- Hell's Kitchen
- Marriage Boot Camp: Reality Stars
- Home Free
- America's Most Wanted
- Table for One
- Me & Mrs. C
- Cold Case Files
- Cooper's Treasure
- Home Free
- Hacking the Wild
- 1ndustry
- American Grit
