= Murder of Aimee Willard =

1996 murder of American college athlete

Aimee Willard
- Willard While Playing soccer
- Born: Aimee Ellen Willard; June 8, 1974; Chester, Pennsylvania, U.S.
- Died: June 20, 1996 (aged 22); Philadelphia, Pennsylvania, U.S.
- Cause of death: Blunt trauma by Murder
- Education: Academy of Notre Dame de Namur; George Mason University
- Known for: Circumstances of her death
Association football career
- Position: Defender
College career
Years	Team	Apps	(Gls)
1992–1995	George Mason Patriots		

Aimee Ellen Willard (June 8, 1974 – June 20, 1996) was an American collegiate athlete who played soccer and lacrosse at George Mason University. A defender on the university's women's soccer team and a leading scorer on its women's lacrosse team, she earned all-conference honors in both sports.

Willard disappeared on June 20, 1996, while driving home after spending the evening with friends near Philadelphia. Her abandoned vehicle was discovered along an exit ramp of Interstate 476, and her body was found later that day in North Philadelphia. The case remained unsolved for nearly two years before authorities identified Arthur Bomar (born: March 3, 1959) through forensic and investigative evidence. Bomar was convicted and sentenced to death.

Public discussion surrounding Bomar's parole history later contributed to passage of "Aimee's Law", a provision of the Victims of Trafficking and Violence Protection Act of 2000.

== Early life and education ==
Willard was born in Chester, Pennsylvania, and attended the Academy of Notre Dame de Namur in Villanova, Pennsylvania.

At Notre Dame de Namur, she participated in athletics and developed into a standout lacrosse player.

Willard later enrolled at George Mason University, where she competed in both soccer and lacrosse.

=== Athletic career ===
Willard played defender for the George Mason Patriots women's soccer team from 1992 through 1995.

In lacrosse, she emerged as one of the university's leading players during the program's early years. During the 1996 season, she led the Colonial Athletic Association in scoring with 50 goals and 29 assists.

Willard earned all-conference recognition in both soccer and lacrosse and was named an All-American in the Southeast Region in lacrosse.

At the conclusion of her career, she held several school records in women's lacrosse, including marks for goals and points.

== Murder ==
=== Disappearance and discovery ===
On the evening of June 19, 1996, Willard met friends near Philadelphia before beginning the drive home during the early morning hours of June 20.

Her vehicle was later discovered abandoned on an exit ramp from Interstate 476. Investigators found the engine running, headlights on, and the driver's-side door open.

Later that day, her body was discovered in North Philadelphia approximately 17 miles (27 km) away.

Authorities determined she had been beaten to death.

=== Investigation ===
The investigation initially produced numerous leads but remained unsolved for nearly two years.

Investigators later renewed attention on Arthur Bomar after another Pennsylvania driver reported a suspicious encounter and provided authorities with a license plate number.

Forensic evidence connected Bomar to the crime. Authorities recovered biological evidence and other physical evidence used during prosecution.

=== Arthur Bomar ===
Arthur Bomar 2026 Mugshot

Bomar had previously been convicted in Nevada in connection with a 1978 murder involving an argument over a parking space.

He was convicted of second-degree murder and later paroled in 1990.

Subsequent reporting found that Bomar committed parole violations but was not returned to Nevada custody.

=== Trial and conviction ===
Bomar was charged with first-degree murder, rape, kidnapping, assault and abuse of a corpse.

Prosecutors argued that Bomar intentionally struck Willard's vehicle to force her to stop before abducting her.

He was convicted in 1998 and sentenced to death.

Bomar later pursued multiple appeals.

== Legacy ==
=== Athletic honors ===
George Mason established the Aimee Willard Commemorative Award in 1997 to honor student-athletes who exemplify qualities associated with Willard, including teamwork and achievement.

US Lacrosse later created the Aimee Willard Award, presented annually in conjunction with women's collegiate competition.

The award was established through cooperation among Willard's family, coaches and the Philadelphia Women's Lacrosse Association.

=== Aimee's Law ===
Willard's murder drew attention to interstate parole supervision issues because Bomar had previously violated parole requirements in Nevada.

Congress later incorporated "Aimee's Law" into the Victims of Trafficking and Violence Protection Act of 2000.

President Bill Clinton signed the legislation into law on October 28, 2000.

The law established financial penalties for states that failed to return parole violators who later committed violent crimes in another state.

== Media coverage ==
Willard's case was featured on television programs including Unsolved Mysteries, Cold Case Files, Forensic Files, and The New Detectives. It was also examined in the documentary film The Dark Side of Parole.
