= Maria Aspan =

American journalist (born c. 1982)

Maria H. Aspan
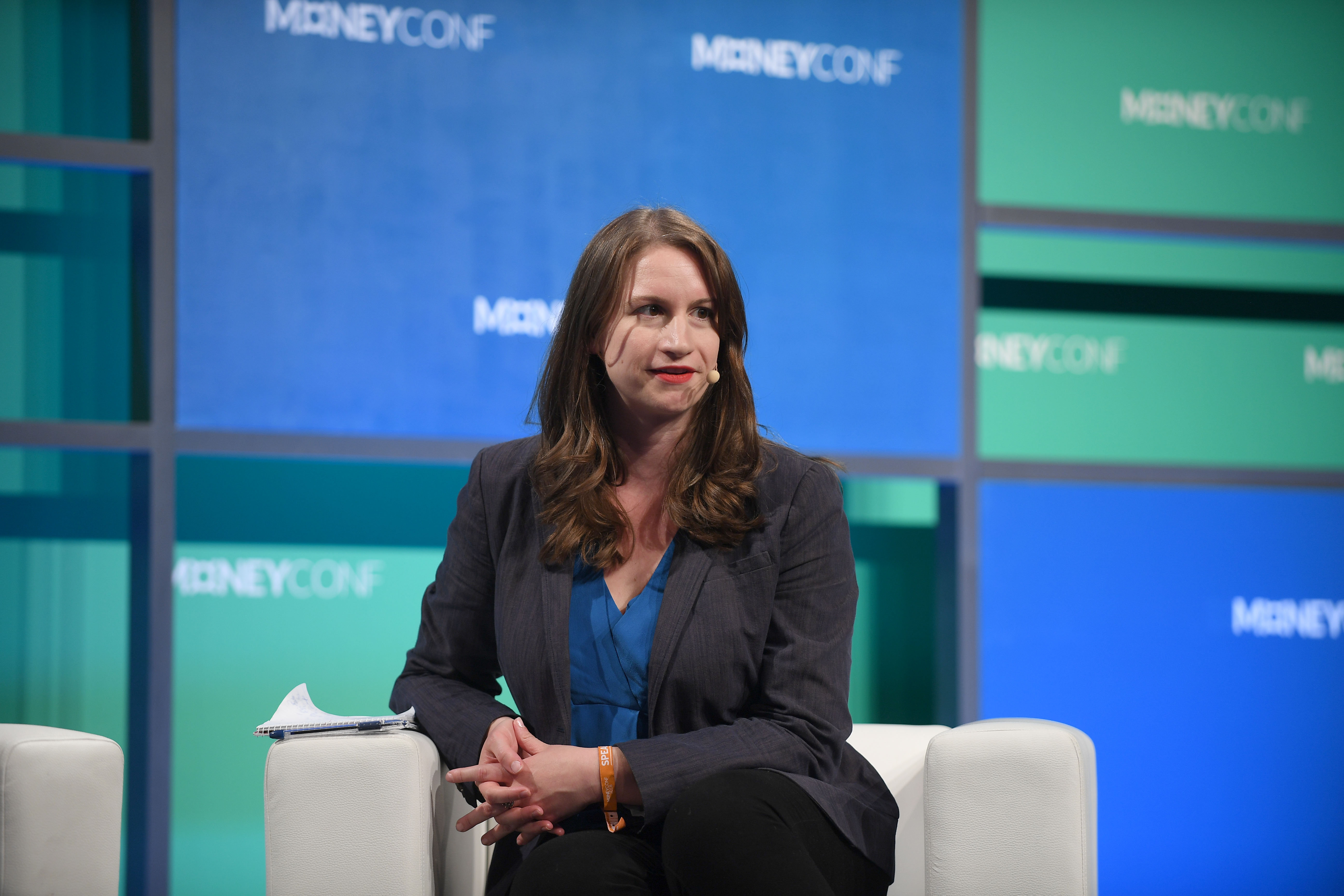
- Born: c. 1982
- Status: single
- Occupation: journalist
- Notable credit(s): Inc., American Banker, The New York Times

Maria H. Aspan is an American journalist who is currently a senior editor at Inc.

== Career ==
Aspan began her career in journalism working for The New York Times in Paris and New York, where she wrote for the daily financial and cultural news pages, as well as for the Regional (Long Island, New Jersey, Westchester and Connecticut) weekly section.

In February 2008, Aspan left the Times to work for American Banker magazine, where she was initially a finance editor. Until May 2014, she was the national editor responsible for reporting on banks and industry strategy. Prior to her stint as national editor of American Banker, Aspan worked at Reuters covering credit cards and banking.

== Personal ==
As a student at the Academy of Notre Dame de Namur, Aspan was a finalist in The Fountainhead Essay Contest, sponsored by the Ayn Rand Institute, in 1999.

Aspan is a 2004 alumna of Georgetown University's Edmund A. Walsh School of Foreign Service.

== Partial bibliography ==
- "Courthouse 'Rocket Dockets' Give Debt Collectors Edge Over Debtors." American Banker, 11 February 2014.
- "After Stumbling, Facebook Finds a Working Eraser." The New York Times, 18 February 2008.
- "Quitting Facebook Gets Easier." The New York Times, 13 February 2008.
- "How Sticky Is Membership on Facebook? Just Try Breaking Free." The New York Times, 11 February 2008.
- "Don’t Open This Cookie (Disastrous Day Inside)." The New York Times, 8 October 2007.
- "Andy Rooney Regrets a Racist Comment in a Recent Column." The New York Times, 27 August 2007.
- "MEDIA: As Blogs Proliferate, a Gadfly With Accreditation at the U.N." The New York Times, 30 April 2007.
- "The Latest Real Estate Drama in the Hamptons Is About Newspaper Turf." The New York Times, 9 April 2007.
- "Rites of Spring; Befriending God." The New York Times, 8 April 2007.
- "TV Is Now Interactive, Minus Images, on the Web." The New York Times, 8 July 2006.
- "Nielsen Will Start to Measure TV Habits of College Students." The New York Times, 20 February 2006.
