= Gerald Mason =

American murderer

- Born: Gerald Fiten Mason; January 31, 1934; Columbia, South Carolina, U.S.
- Died: January 22, 2017 (aged 82); Columbia, South Carolina, U.S.
- Status: Deceased
- Conviction: First degree murder (2 counts)
- Penalty: Life imprisonment

Details
- Victims: El Segundo police officers Milton Curtis and Richard Phillips
- Date: July 22, 1957
- Country: United States
- State: California
- Location: El Segundo
- Date apprehended: January 29, 2003

Gerald Fiten Mason (January 31, 1934 – January 22, 2017) was an American convicted murderer and rapist. Mason's 2003 arrest and prosecution for the 1957 murders of two El Segundo, California police officers made national headlines.

== Criminal career ==
Born in Columbia, South Carolina, he was arrested and spent time in prison for burglary in that state in 1956. After his release in 1957, then aged 23, he hitchhiked his way to California, stopping in Shreveport, Louisiana where he purchased a revolver using an alias. He later stated that it was purchased for protection while hitchhiking.

In Hawthorne, California, Mason came upon four teenagers at a local lover's lane. Drawing his revolver, Mason forced the two couples to strip down to their underwear and bound and blindfolded them. He then raped one of the girls. Leaving the teens alive as they were, Mason then drove off in their 1949 Ford sedan, ran a red light, and was pulled over by Officers Richard Phillips and Milton Curtis of the El Segundo Police Department.

Mason later recalled, "I thought, 'If I don't get them, they're gonna get me.' So when the officer turned away from me, I shot both officers, got back in the car and drove away." Backup units and medical personnel arrived on scene to find Curtis dead in his patrol car, with Phillips lying mortally wounded on the ground. Both had been shot three times. Meanwhile, Mason, who had been wounded by a bullet from Officer Phillips, dumped the car and fled through numerous backyards before hitchhiking his way to safety.

== Investigation ==
The murders of Officers Phillips and Curtis touched off a homicide investigation that continued for almost half a century. In 1960, the murder weapon was recovered a mile from the crime in a back yard. The serial number was traced to a purchase at Sears in Shreveport, Louisiana, under the alias George D. Wilson. The signature was matched to "Wilson's" signature on a downtown YMCA receipt, located near the Sears store. El Segundo detectives proceeded to track down every George D. Wilson in the United States. However all were ruled out, and the investigation went cold.

For the next 46 years, Mason was a law-abiding citizen. He owned seven service stations, married, and raised a family. He was later described by friends and neighbors as friendly and helpful.

In 2002, with advances in computerized finger-printing technology, the FBI decided to expand the system to include prints collected during arrests in all 50 states. A match based on the partial left thumb prints lifted from the steering wheel of the stolen car, came back to a man convicted of burglary in 1956 in Columbia. He had served time for that case. Besides the matching fingerprint the evidence was also based on matching handwriting, thus linking him to the murder weapon.

Police located Mason, who had returned to and was still living in his hometown of Columbia, South Carolina. Following his arrest, Mason was further identified by the bullet graze wound scar on his back from a bullet fired by Officer Phillips in 1957.

Mason told detectives, "I really don't have an explanation for why this happened. I wish I did." When asked why he had raped a 15-year-old girl, Mason responded that he no longer remembered.

== Sentencing ==
Mason pleaded guilty to the murders and was sentenced to two consecutive life terms, with a minimum of seven years. As part of the deal, the rape, robbery and grand theft charges were dropped, which spared surviving victims from having to testify and Mason's family from having to listen to testimony about how he had raped a teenage girl. At his sentencing hearing, Mason tearfully apologized to the families of Officers Phillips and Curtis. He said, "It's impossible to express to so many people how sorry I am. I do not understand why I did this. It does not fit in my life. It is not the person I know. I detest these crimes."

One El Segundo detective commented, "He was remorseful. But I think he was more sad and more sorry for having been caught."

Mason, 75, was turned down for parole in 2009. The three-member board decided Mason should not come before the panel again for the maximum period of 15 years until March 2024 when he would have been 90 years old. California prosecutors were determined that he would never be released.

He was incarcerated in South Carolina, as his plea bargain granted him approval to serve his prison sentence near his family.

The widow of Officer Curtis commented, "I'm not his victim any more. My son is not his victim any more. I'm so grateful, and I had to wait this long. It's worth the wait."

In a 2003 interview with People, Terri, Gerald Mason's daughter, said, "There really aren't words to describe the range of emotions we've gone through." Even so, she insisted, "I could not have had a better father."

This story was shown on episodes of Cold Case Files, Forensic Files, 48 Hours Mystery and Murder Book.

== Death ==
Mason died in prison on January 22, 2017, nine days before his 83rd birthday. He had spent 14 years in prison. His next parole hearing was still seven years away.

== Sources ==
- "Final Justice: The Past Catches Up with Gerald Mason, a Murderer on the Lam Since 1957", People Magazine, Author: Patrick Rogers, Date: May 19, 2003. (accessed August 11, 2010).
- "The Ghosts Of El Segundo: Cold-Blooded Crime Haunts Investigators For Half A Century", CBS News, Author: Rebecca Leung, Date: October 2, 2004. (accessed August 11, 2010).
- “Man sentenced to life in two 1957 murders” Los Angeles Times, Authors: Richard Winton, Steve Berry, Date: March 25, 2003. (Accessed August 29, 2015)
