= Academy of Notre Dame de Namur =

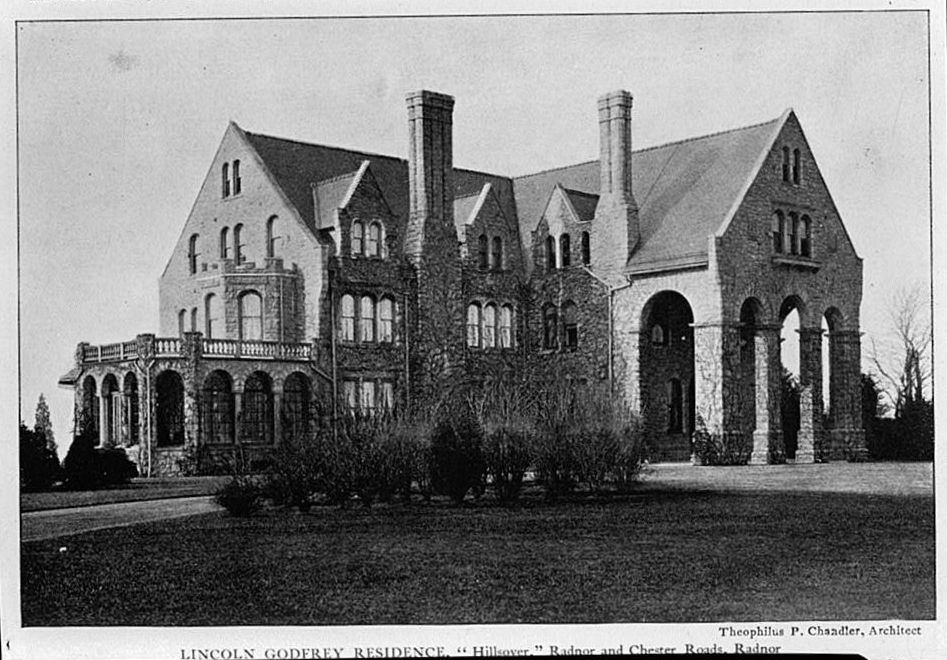

Location
- 560 Sproul Road; Radnor, (Delaware County), Pennsylvania 19085; United States; 40°1′1″N 75°22′13″W

Information
- Type: Private, All-Female
- Motto: fides et caritas
- Religious affiliation: Roman Catholic
- Established: 1856
- Head of school: Dr. Laura M. Hotchkiss
- Grades: 6-12
- Colors: Blue and Gold
- Athletics conference: Girls Interac League
- Mascot: Leprechaun
- Team name: Irish
- Accreditation: Middle States Association of Colleges and Schools
- Newspaper: The Gates
- Yearbook: Launfal
- Website: http://www.ndapa.org

The Academy of Notre Dame de Namur is a private middle school and high school for girls in the Ithan neighborhood of Radnor, Pennsylvania. It is located within the Roman Catholic Archdiocese of Philadelphia; however, Notre Dame is an independent school. Notre Dame's mission is "to educate young women for responsible living in a global society with an extensive co-curricular and athletic program."

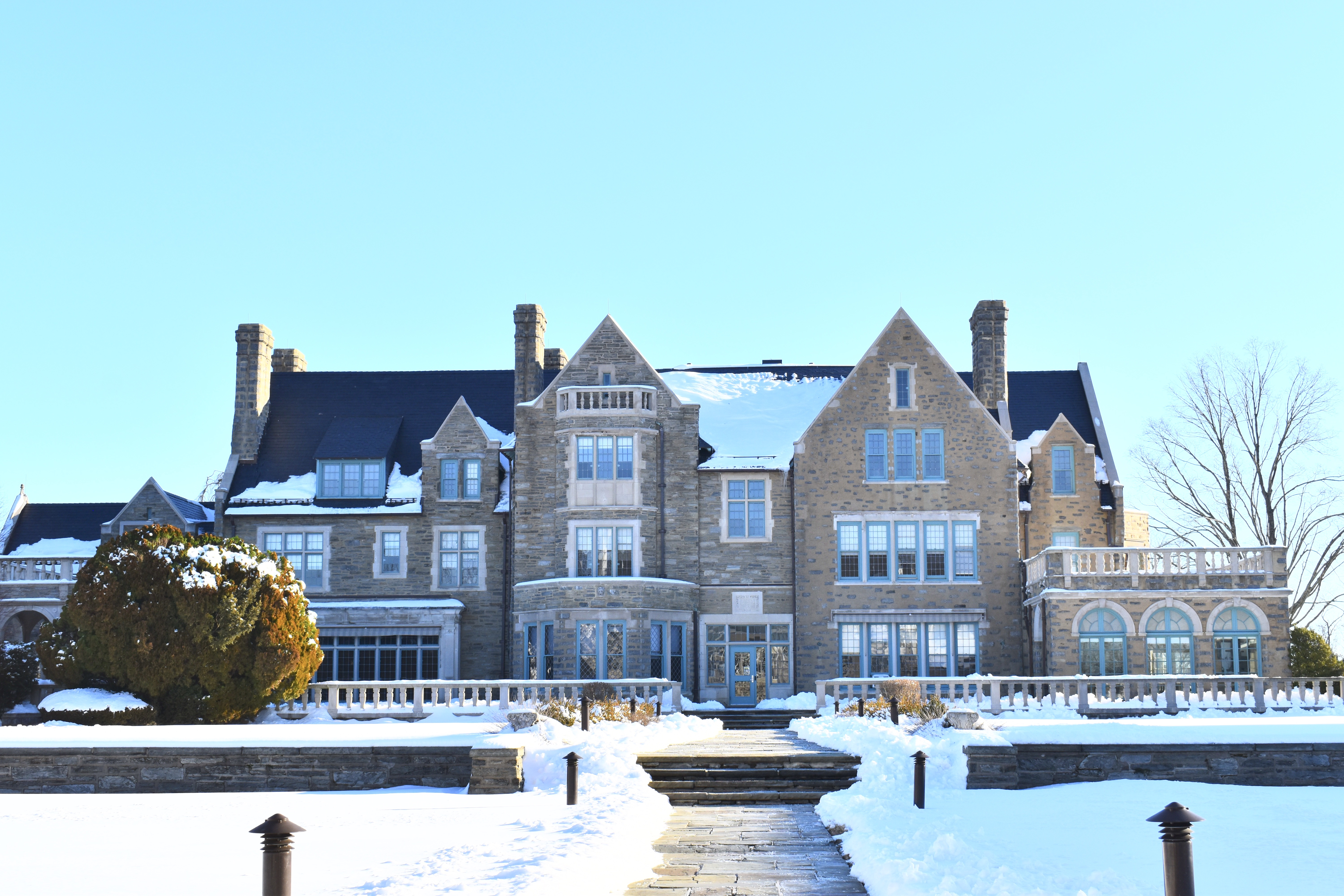

== Background ==
In 1854, Bishop John Neumann invited the Sisters of Notre Dame de Namur to open a school for girls in Philadelphia and on October 15, 1856, Sister Superior Louise opened “The Academy”. The first school opened in the Parish of the Assumption on Spring Garden St. where it was located for 75 years, and existed in several locations throughout the Greater Philadelphia area over the years to accommodate its growth. The Academy ultimately landed at its current Villanova campus as the Academy of Notre Dame de Namur in the 1940s at the hands of Sister Superior Julie, now known as Saint Julie.

In 1943, the school entered into an agreement to purchase "Launfal," the 50-acre estate of the late utilities magnate, Clarence Geist and took possession of the property on January 1, 1944. Local legend had it that the mansion, was used as location scenes in the film The Philadelphia Story, starring Cary Grant and Katharine Hepburn but that has been disproved by historians, noting that the motion picture was filmed exclusively on a soundstage in Hollywood.

After officially purchasing the Mansion and surrounding property in 2006, the school became an independent educational institution affiliated with the Sisters of Notre Dame. Since the Academy’s establishment, learning buildings and athletic fields have been added to the campus to address the needs of the Notre Dame community. Still, the Mansion maintains its legacy of being an anchor for the school.

Today, the academy continues to educate young women on “what they need to know for life.”

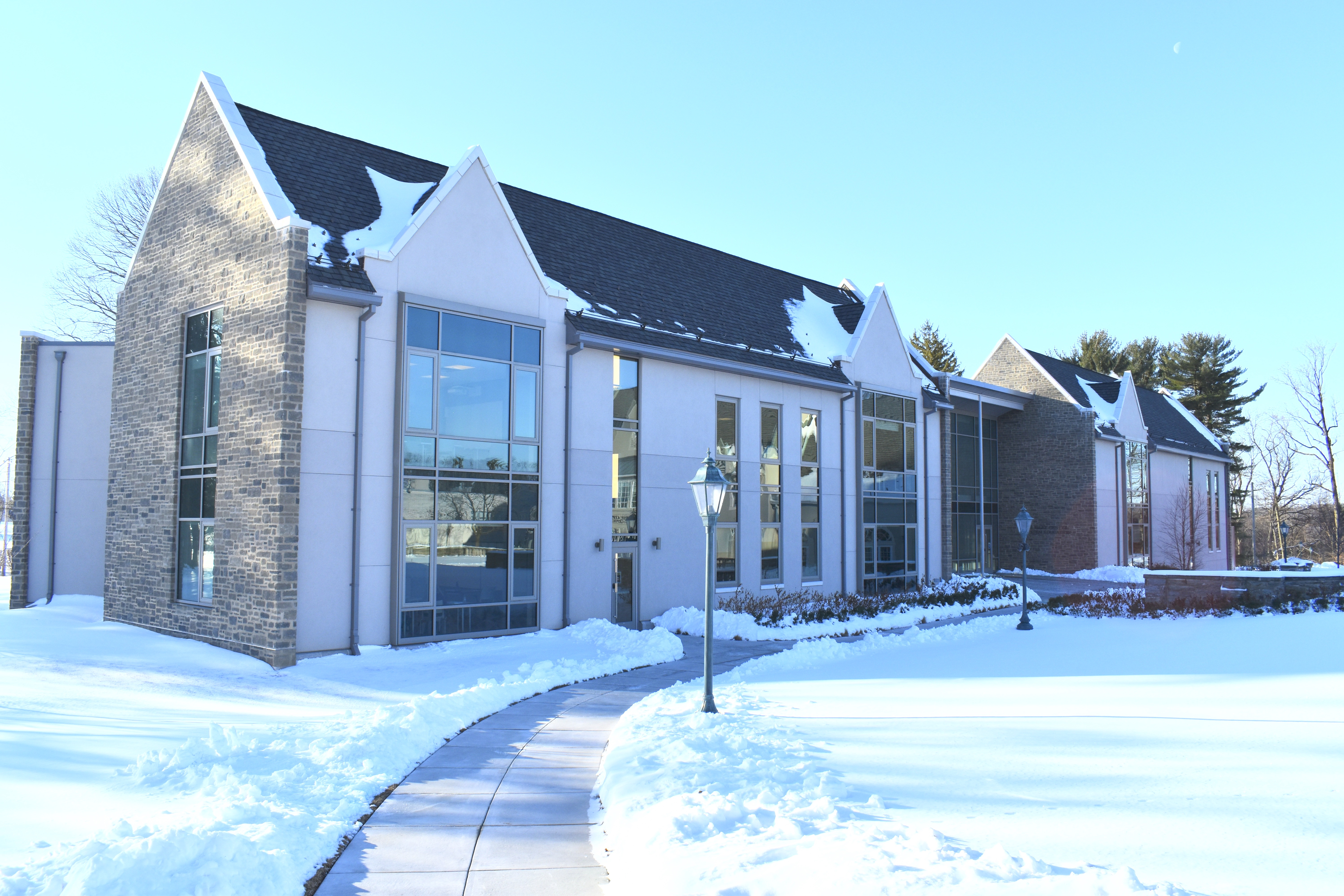

== Notable alumni ==
- Maria Aspan: Professional journalist
- Lisa Raymond: an American professional tennis player who has achieved notable success in doubles tennis. Raymond has 11 Grand Slam titles to her name: 6 in women's doubles and 5 in mixed doubles
- Katherine Moennig: actress from The L Word, Ray Donovan and Young Americans.
- Aimee Willard: murder victim in a case that brought national prominence to the issue of police impersonation.
