= Marybeth Davis =

American nurse

- Born: c. 1952 (age 73–74)
- Occupation: Nurse
- Spouse: Gary Davis (divorced)
- Children: Tegan Davis, Seth Davis
- Status: Released after plea deal (2007)
- Motive: Münchausen syndrome by proxy (presumably)
- Convictions: Attempt to kill or injure by poison (2 counts; reduced from first degree murder on appeal)
- Penalty: Life imprisonment without parole; commuted to 3 to 18 years imprisonment

Marybeth Davis (born c. 1952) is an American former nurse who was convicted of the murders of her two children in 1997, although she had maintained her innocence for several years. Davis was released from prison in 2007 after accepting a plea deal and confessing to the crimes.

== Case history ==
In September 1981, in Lewisburg, West Virginia, Davis's infant son, Seth, had suffered massive damage to his brain, which prosecutors believed was caused by an injection of a large amount of insulin. He was later moved to a mental institution where he spent the rest of his life. Several months after the incident with Seth, on 11 March 1982, Davis's three-year-old daughter, Tegan, died of a caffeine pill overdose. Dr. Anne Hooper, who performed the autopsy on the girl, found hundreds of capsules inside the digestive tract, and she then concluded that the manner of death was likely a homicide.

== Trial ==
Tegan (left) and Seth Davis

In 1997, Davis was placed on trial for the murder of Tegan and the injury to Seth. It was reported that prosecutors believed that Davis suffered from Factitious disorder imposed on another, which is a condition where an individual would falsify sickness in their children to gain attention and sympathy. Although it was believed that Davis had caused the overdose of her son, she had previously stated that he suffered from Leigh syndrome or an unspecified growth hormone deficiency. Apart from this, Dr. Barry Wolfe believed that Tegan had suffered from the same genetic disorder. Tegan had been diagnosed with Reye syndrome shortly before she died in 1982. In Marybeth's defense, these details contradicted Dr. Hooper's report that Tegan was murdered. Although these details were present, Davis received a life sentence without the possibility of parole. Seth Davis died on 10 October 2002 at the age of 21; his death was recorded as a homicide.

After signing a plea deal for two counts of attempt to injure by poison and giving a one-word confession in 2007, the then 55-year-old Marybeth Davis was released from prison on time served.

== In media ==
- In 1999, the A&E series Cold Case Files featured the case on their episode, "Maternal Instinct."
- In 2005, the television series Guilty or Innocent? detailed the events on an episode titled "The Mary Beth Davis Case."
