= Roy Melanson =

American serial killer and rapist (1937–2020)

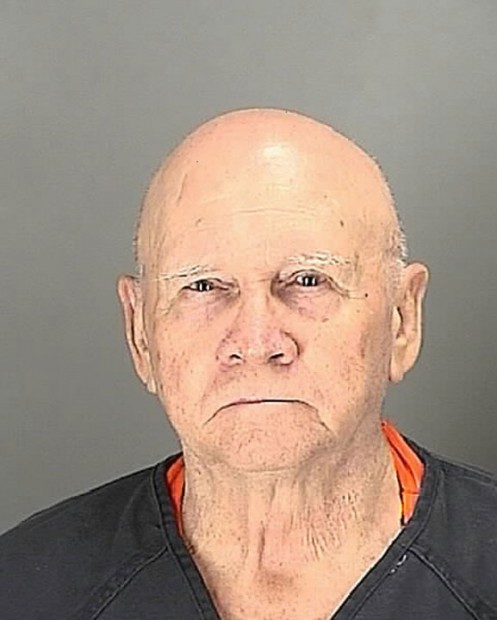
- Mugshot
- Born: Roy Allan Melanson; February 13, 1937; Breaux Bridge, Louisiana, U.S.
- Died: May 22, 2020 (aged 83); Colorado Territorial Correctional Facility, Cañon City, Colorado, U.S.
- Convictions: Colorado; First degree murder California; First degree murder
- Penalty: Life imprisonment

Details
- Victims: 3–5+
- Span of crimes: 1974–1988
- Country: United States
- States: California, Colorado, Louisiana, possibly Texas
- Date apprehended: For the final time in January 1992

Roy Allan Melanson (February 13, 1937 – May 22, 2020) was an American serial killer and rapist, conclusively linked to three murders and numerous rapes in three states, and remains the prime suspect in at least two other murders. Melanson was convicted of two 1974 murders, for which he received two life sentences, and died in May 2020 at the Colorado Territorial Correctional Facility, in Cañon City, Colorado.

== Early life and crimes ==
Hailing from Breaux Bridge, Louisiana, Melanson was a drifter and con artist who spent a majority of his life in various prisons. Some of his earliest offenses include burglaries and rapes in Orange and Jefferson County, Texas, for the latter of which he was given 12 years imprisonment, but served only half of it. He allegedly killed an inmate while imprisoned in Texas. In 1975, he was extradited for a rape trial, which landed him a life sentence. However, it was reduced, and he was released in March 1988, a few months before the murder of one suspected victim.

== Murders ==
=== Anita Andrews ===
A one-time county fair beauty queen, 51-year-old Anita Andrews was a single mother working two jobs, one at the Napa State Hospital and the other being at the family bar named "Fagiani's Cocktail Lounge", inherited by both Andrews and her sister Muriel from their father. She was last seen alive on July 10, 1974, tending to the bar, which was near closing hours, as one stranger was still hanging around the premises.

The following morning, Muriel found her sister's body in a pool of blood on the floor. Anita Andrews had been raped, her clothes ripped through, stabbed 13 times with a screwdriver, in addition to having her throat slashed. Her Cadillac Eldorado was also missing. The killer had left several clues behind—a cigarette butt in an ashtray, a partial bloody fingerprint on a rear staircase, fingerprints on a bottle and an open cash register. Despite this, it would take decades for her case to be resolved.

=== Michele Wallace ===
In August 1974, Melanson arrived in Gunnison County, Colorado, presenting himself as an experienced sheepherder. One rancher from the area even hired him to hunt down mountain lions and coyotes who were killing his flock. One afternoon, while in the "Timbers Bar" in Gunnison, Colorado, Melanson got acquainted with local ranch hand Charles Matthews, asking for a ride. However, Matthews' car broke down while on the road, just as Michele Wallace (referred to in some sources as 'Michele French'), who was returning from a backpacking trip, drove by. She offered both men a ride, and after dropping off Matthews back at the bar, she and Melanson continued on. From that moment, nobody saw her alive ever again.

Wallace's disappearance became a cold case, and remained as such until one county sheriff decided to re-open it in the early 1990s. Not long after, Wallace's remains were found off a remote mountain road, but it could not be determined how exactly she had died.

Wallace's father George was murdered himself on January 13, 2006, at his St. Petersburg, Florida home. The two attackers, 21-year-old Stephen Sterling and 17-year-old Eugene Wesley were arrested the following month. In 2008, Wesley pleaded guilty to second degree murder and was sentenced to 25 years in prison. That same year Sterling was convicted of first degree murder and was given a life sentence.

=== Pauline Klumpp ===
A suspected victim of Melanson, 51-year-old Pauline Klumpp was renting a home to Melanson, his ex-wife and her new boyfriend in the Port Acres area of Port Arthur, Texas. One day in 1988, she asked Melanson for help with her air conditioner, as well as to pick up a TV from the trio. The two were last seen together, but Klumpp mysteriously vanished after that. Klumpp's then-husband, who was staying in a motel for his out-of-town job in Galveston, regularly returned home to ensure that Klumpp was all right. He came home to find a pot of gumbo on the stove, which apparently had been cooking for days. Four days after her disappearance, her car was found behind a grocery store, with the TV still inside.

Det. Scott Gaspard, who is in charge of solving Klumpp's cold case, has said that Melanson had been the prime suspect since the very beginning.

=== Charlotte Sauerwin ===
About a month later, Melanson was in Walker, Louisiana, a small town east of Baton Rouge. While hanging around a laundromat on August 5, 1988, he overheard 24-year-old Charlotte Sauerwin gossiping about how long it was taking for her fiancé, Vincent LeJeune, to save money so they could buy land for a home. In that moment, Melanson stepped in, presenting himself as a land developer with a sensible offer, for not much money. When the other people left the laundromat, Melanson attacked her, viciously raping and torturing Sauerwin, before eventually strangling and cutting her throat. He then tied a strap around her neck, dragging the body near a shed, where he dumped it.

== Trial and imprisonment ==
Melanson was arrested in Kentucky in January 1992, on unrelated charges of burglary. In August of that year, after Michele Wallace's remains were located, Melanson was transported to Colorado to stand trial for the murder. Melanson was found to be in possession of her car and other items, including her camera, which showed him posing with a yet-unidentified teenager. In September 1993, he was brought to trial, convicted and sentenced to life imprisonment for her murder, based on hair evidence collected from her scalp. It was not until 2000, when a newly enacted federal law obliged him to submit his DNA for testing, when authorities got a chance to solve the other murders.

DNA evidence connected him to the murders of both Andrews and Sauerwin in 2010, but he was tried only for the murder of Andrews in 2011, receiving another life imprisonment term. Since then, law enforcement agencies around the country started reviewing their cold cases, with the hope that they could connect Melanson to any further crimes. Melanson was uncooperative with police and repeatedly tried to apply for parole before the Colorado Supreme Court, without success.

Melanson died on May 22, 2020, while serving his sentence. His death was not announced until 2021 when the Napa District Attorney's Office called the prison to check on him.

== See also ==
- List of serial killers in the United States

== Bibliography ==
- Todd L. Shulman (August 14, 2012). Murder and Mayhem in the Napa Valley. Arcadia Publishing. ISBN 9781614236269.
- Steve Jackson (April 7, 2016). Smooth Talker: Trail of Death. WildBlue Press. ISBN 978-1942266433.
