= Murder of Irene Garza =

American school teacher and murder victim

- Date: April 16, 1960
- Location: McAllen, Texas, U.S.
- Cause: Suffocation
- Arrests: John Bernard Feit
- Convicted: Murder with malice
- Sentence: Life imprisonment

Irene Garza (November 15, 1934 – April 16, 1960) was an American schoolteacher and beauty queen whose death was the subject of investigation for several decades. She was last seen alive on April 16, 1960, when she went to confession at a church in McAllen, Texas. She was reported missing the following morning. Following the largest volunteer search to that date in the Rio Grande Valley, Garza's body was discovered in a canal on April 21. An autopsy concluded that she had been sexually assaulted before being killed; the cause of death was suffocation.

John Bernard Feit, the Catholic priest who heard Garza's last confession, was the only identified suspect in her death. Two clergymen, Dale Tacheny and Joseph O'Brien, came forward to authorities in 2002 to report that Feit had confessed to Garza's murder shortly after the crime. He had since left the priesthood, married and had a family. For many years, the district attorney in Hidalgo County considered the evidence against Feit to be too weak to secure a conviction. He brought the case before a grand jury in 2004, but Feit, Tacheny and O'Brien were not subpoenaed and the jury did not indict Feit.

The investigation into Garza's death was renewed in 2015 after a new district attorney took office in Hidalgo County. In February 2016, the 83-year-old Feit was arrested in Arizona in connection with Garza's death. He was later extradited to Texas. His murder trial began in late November 2017. On December 7, 2017, Feit was found guilty of murder with malice and the next day was sentenced to life imprisonment. Feit died in February 2020.

== Background ==
Location of Hidalgo County, Texas, near the US-Mexico border

Irene Garza was born in 1934. Her parents, Nicolas and Josefina, owned a dry cleaning business in McAllen, Texas, a city located in the South Texas border region known as the Rio Grande Valley. By the time Garza was a teenager, her parents' business had become successful, and the family was able to move from the south side of McAllen to a more affluent area on the north side. She graduated from McAllen High School, where she had become the first Latina to perform as a twirler or head drum majorette. Garza was crowned the 1958 Miss All South Texas Sweetheart and was a homecoming queen at Pan American College.

At the time of her death, Garza was a second-grade schoolteacher; she taught indigent students at an elementary school on the south side of McAllen. In a letter written to a friend before her disappearance, she described herself as extremely shy but expressed fulfillment in her work. Noting that she had recently become secretary of her parent-teacher association, Garza said that she was beginning to feel more confident in herself. A member of the Legion of Mary, she took her Catholic faith seriously. In her letter, Garza indicated that she found comfort in attending daily Mass and Communion.

On Saturday, April 16, 1960, Garza–who lived with her parents–told them that she was going to confession at Sacred Heart Church in McAllen. She was often conspicuous in the congregation because of her striking appearance, and several parishioners remembered seeing Garza at the church that night. When her parents did not hear from her that evening, they first thought that she had stayed at the church for the Easter Vigil mass. When Garza did not return home by 3:00 a.m., they went to the McAllen Police Department to report their daughter missing.

== Investigation ==
On April 18, in a trail of evidence stretching several hundred yards down a McAllen road, passersby found Garza's purse, her left shoe and her lace veil. Authorities and volunteers started a search that was the largest in Rio Grande Valley history at that time. A woman claiming to be Garza called her home, saying that she had been kidnapped and taken to a hotel in nearby Hidalgo, but the call was found to have been false. Another person told an Edinburg waitress that he had killed Garza, but that was found to be a joke made after the man had been drinking heavily.

Garza's body was found in a canal on April 21, in an area several miles away from the other evidence. From the postmortem examination, medical examiners could tell that Garza had died of suffocation. She had been raped while unconscious and beaten. There was bruising over both of her eyes and to the right side of her face. Any physical evidence that might have identified an attacker, such as hair, blood or semen, appeared to have been washed away during the time the body spent in the canal.

Law enforcement officials questioned about 500 people across several Texas cities, including known sex offenders and Garza's family members, co-workers and ex-boyfriends. They carried out almost fifty polygraph examinations, and offered a $2,500 reward for information about her death, which was larger than any amount of money previously offered in a Rio Grande Valley murder case. South Texas businessmen later posted $10,000 of reward money.

=== John Bernard Feit ===
The priest who heard Garza's last confession, Father John Feit (27), came under suspicion soon after her disappearance. Feit had been at the McAllen church since completing seminary training in San Antonio. Church members reported that Feit's confession line moved slowly on the night Garza disappeared and that he was away from the sanctuary several times. When the canal was drained several days after the discovery of Garza's body, Feit's photo slide viewer was found. Fellow priests had noticed scratch marks on Feit's hands after Easter Vigil mass, and said it was irregular for Feit to have taken Garza to the church rectory to hear her confession as he had reportedly done that night. McAllen police initially stated that Feit passed polygraph tests, but the tests were later said to be inconclusive.

Feit initially denied hearing Garza's confession in the rectory, but later admitted to having done so. He accounted for his absence from the sanctuary by claiming that he had broken his glasses that night; he said that he often played with his glasses nervously as he listened to confession. Feit stated that he had driven back to his church's pastoral house, a short drive away, to get another pair of glasses, and when he arrived he had no key, so he had to climb into the house on the second floor. He said that he sustained the scratches on his hands as he was climbing the outside of the brick structure.

Three weeks before Garza's death, a woman named Maria America Guerra had been sexually assaulted while kneeling at the communion rail at another Catholic church in the McAllen area. Rumor held that Feit was responsible, but local church leaders discouraged people from considering the possibility that a priest could have been involved in a violent crime. Feit admitted to visiting a priest at that church on the day of Guerra's attack, but he denied assaulting her. He was later charged with rape, and the trial ended in a hung jury. In 1962, rather than face a second trial, Feit entered a plea of no contest to a misdemeanor charge of aggravated assault and paid a $500 fine. Years later, Feit said he did not understand that a no contest plea would be considered a conviction in the case.

== Stagnation in the case ==
After the legal proceedings in the Guerra case, Feit was sent to Assumption Abbey, a Trappist monastery in Missouri. An abbot at Assumption Abbey told monk Dale Tacheny that Feit had killed someone and asked Tacheny to counsel Feit for a few months to determine whether he had the disposition to become a monk. Tacheny said that Feit confessed to hurting a young lady and murdering another one, but he said it was not his job to judge Feit at the time. Feit's confession went unreported to authorities for many years.

Feit did not feel comfortable with the monastic lifestyle at Assumption Abbey. He was sent to Jemez Springs, New Mexico, to a treatment retreat for troubled priests run by the Servants of the Paraclete, after which he joined the order as a staff member and worked his way into a supervisory role at the center. James Porter came to the center after he was known to have begun molesting children in the 1960s, and Feit cleared him for placement in another parish. Porter was later defrocked and imprisoned after abusing as many as 100 children.

Feit left the priesthood in the 1970s. He married, moved to the Phoenix area and had three children. He worked at the Society of Saint Vincent de Paul as a food charity volunteer for seventeen years.

In 2002, Tacheny decided he could no longer keep the secret of Feit's confession. Thinking that the murder had taken place in San Antonio because Feit had trained there, Tacheny called authorities in that city. The investigation into Garza's death was reopened that year. Texas Rangers investigator Rudy Jaramillo contacted Joseph O'Brien, a priest who had worked with Feit at the time of Garza's death. While O'Brien had told a television program in 2000 that he did not know anything about the murder, he admitted to Jaramillo that Feit had confessed shortly after it had taken place. Later in 2002, the polygraph examiner who had tested Feit in 1960 said that he questioned the reported results. The initial report said that Feit passed the polygraph, but the report was later edited to say that the results were inconclusive; the examiner felt all along that Feit had failed the test.

Rene Guerra (no relation to Maria America Guerra), the district attorney of Hidalgo County from the 1980s until 2014, chose not to bring the Garza case before a grand jury until 2004. Tacheny, O'Brien and Feit did not receive subpoenas in the case, and the grand jury declined to indict Feit. O'Brien died in 2005. Guerra was reluctant to revisit the case, saying that the early police investigation had been shoddy, that O'Brien was suffering from dementia when he was questioned and that there was no physical evidence. He said that Jaramillo had inappropriately fed Tacheny the location of the murder after the monk mistakenly said it occurred in San Antonio. Guerra angered Garza's family by asking, "Why would anyone be haunted by her death? She died. Her killer got away."

== Renewed interest ==
In 2014, district court judge Ricardo Rodriguez campaigned to unseat Guerra as district attorney, and the Garza case arose as a campaign issue. Rodriguez said that he wanted justice for the Garza family, and promised to take a new look at the case if he were elected. In the days following Rodriguez' election as district attorney, Guerra sought to appoint him as a special prosecutor in the Garza case. Rodriguez declined, saying that he preferred to take a new look at the evidence once he took office in January 2015. In April, he announced that the Garza case was reopened.

In February 2016, Feit was arrested in Scottsdale, Arizona. He was 83 at the time of his arrest, and he used a walker when he appeared in court. Feit was extradited to Texas in March 2016 and incarcerated at the Hidalgo County Sheriff Adult Detention Facility. He entered a plea of not guilty. The prosecution requested a $750,000 bond, while the defense team asked for a $100,000 bond, adding that Feit had stage 3 kidney and bladder cancer. Judge Luis Singleterry set a $1 million bond.

Status hearings in the case were held in June and November 2016, and the discovery process was ongoing as of November. In February 2017, a judge set a late April trial date, and Feit remained under medical supervision at the Hidalgo County jail. In April 2017, Feit's defense filed for a change of venue because they believed that their client would not receive a fair and impartial trial in Hidalgo County. They filed a 700-page document with evidence showing that reporters allegedly condemned Feit as a murderer, and that the only reason why he avoided prosecution for years was because the Roman Catholic Church had protected him. Sometime in March, Tacheny testified against Feit in closed deposition. This was permitted under Texas law given the witness' age and exclusive knowledge of the case.

On May 24, Judge Singleterry heard arguments from the prosecution and the defense on the request for the change of venue. On June 7, he denied a request for a change of venue after considering that the defendant failed to prove that there was prejudice against him in the Hidalgo community. On July 19, Feit appeared in court for a prehearing. The trial was expected to begin on September 11. However, on September 10, the court decided to push the trial back because of scheduling conflicts; one of Feit's attorneys was defending another high-profile murder suspect in Hidalgo County. Feit appeared in court on September 11 – for the first time without a prison uniform – expecting to face trial that week. The initial phase of jury selection was done in mid-September; the trial was delayed until mid-October. On October 30, Feit's defense filed a motion for continuance; jury selection was reset to November 14 and the November 6 trial date was moved back to November 28.

On December 7, Feit was convicted of Garza's murder. In the sentencing phase of the trial, Feit's defense attorney asked that Feit be given probation, citing his lack of felony convictions since Garza's death. The prosecution asked for a sentence of 57 years, which was symbolic of the amount of time that had passed since Garza's death, but on December 8, 2017, the jury pronounced a sentence of life in prison.

Feit was incarcerated at the W. J. Estelle Unit, ten miles (16 km) north of central Huntsville, Texas. He died of natural causes on February 12, 2020.

== See also ==
- List of solved missing person cases
