= Mark Wayne Rathbun =

American rapist

Details
- Span of crimes: 1997–2002
- Country: United States
- State: California
- Date apprehended: November 2002

Mark Wayne Rathbun, better known as the Belmont Shore Rapist, is an American serial rapist who was active on the west coast of the United States during the late 1990s and early 2000s. Between 1997 and 2002, Rathbun committed at least fourteen rapes in Los Angeles County and Orange County, California. Many of Rathbun's attacks were committed in the Belmont Shore district of Long Beach, California, hence his nickname. In addition to striking in Long Beach, Rathbun was also active in the cities of Huntington Beach and Los Alamitos.

Rathbun's modus operandi was to commit a hot prowl burglary coupled with a sexual attack. Rathbun would break into a victim's home in the middle of the night, enter her bedroom wearing a mask, remove his clothing, then pounce on his victim in her bed while she slept. All of Rathbun's confirmed victims were single women, ranging in age from thirty-four to seventy-seven, most of whom lived alone.

After being identified as a suspect in the Belmont Shore rape series, Rathbun was arrested in Oxnard, California in November 2002. Detectives obtained an oral swab from Rathbun while he was in custody, and a criminalist was able to match this sample to biological evidence which was left behind at the Belmont Shore Rapist's crime scenes. As a result, the Los Angeles County District Attorney's Office charged Rathbun with sixty-three felony counts in 2003. Following his indictment in California, authorities in Seattle, Washington linked Rathbun's DNA to rapes which were committed in their jurisdiction.

In August 2004, an eight man, four woman jury found Rathbun guilty of fifty-nine felonies, including multiple counts of forcible rape, forcible oral copulation, sodomy by use of force, penetration with a foreign object, first-degree burglary, and assault. Prior to being convicted as the Belmost Shore Rapist, Rathbun had accumulated convictions for burglary and false imprisonment. However, Rathbun had only received probation for his earlier convictions.

On September 15, 2004, Los Angeles County Superior Court Judge Joan Camparet-Cassani sentenced Rathbun to 1,030 years, plus ten life terms, in prison.

On October 13, 2008, a jury in King County, Washington convicted Rathbun of three rapes which occurred in the Phinney Ridge neighborhood of Seattle in 1996. Rathbun was sentenced to 100 years in prison for these crimes. His sentence will run consecutive to his sentences in California, where he is being held presently.
