= Dennis Rabbitt =

American serial rapist (born 1956)

Dennis Nathaniel Rabbitt (born June 28, 1956), known as The South Side Rapist, is an American serial rapist who raped between 16 and 29 women in St. Louis, Missouri and the surrounding areas between 1988 and 1998. He pleaded guilty to 20 rapes and was subsequently sentenced to life imprisonment for his crimes.

== Biography ==
Dennis Nathaniel Rabbitt was born on June 28, 1956, in St. Louis, Missouri, the only child of a middle-class couple, with some rumors claiming that he was the godson of baseball player Stan Musial. His father was an entrepreneur who owned a popular bar in the city and had relatives who were members of major political and social organizations, thanks to which Rabbitt had a relatively lavish upbringing. During his school years, he attended the Bishop DuBourg High School, where he was noted for his tall build and affinity for softball, but did not achieve outstanding results in any other fields.

Because of his introverted personality, Rabbitt had few friends and rarely interacted with girls, but was never bullied or considered a social outcast by his peers. By his own admission, he began to exhibit an unnatural fetish in women at an early age, leading to his interest in browsing through his father's collection of pornographic magazines. During this time period, he would go around peeping through a female neighbor's window to watch her engage in intimate activities, but was eventually caught.

Even after his family changed residences, Rabbitt continued to spend all his free time away from school peeping on women in areas of St. Louis. According to his testimony, after his parents learned of his sexual deviations in his high school years, his mother drilled a hole in the bathroom door in order to observe and prevent him from engaging in masturbation, only for him to begin watching her doing intimate activities.

In 1970, Rabbitt was arrested for voyeurism and lodged in the county jail, where he was subjected to a psychiatric examination, which found him to be sane and lacking in any sexual deviations. In 1973, Rabbitt broke into the home of a girl and, under the threat of a knife, attempted to assault her, but his victim resisted so fiercely that he dropped it and was forced to flee. Rabbitt claimed that he became a police suspect in the crime due to the fingerprints found on the knife, which belonged to his father, but he was not arrested due to his father's family connections.

After high school, he changed several jobs, and in the late 1970s, he met a woman who was impregnated by him. The pair married in 1980 and had two children together. In the early 1980s, Rabbitt, with support from his father, also went into business and opened a bar.

In 1982, Rabbitt's mother was shot and killed by her second husband in front of Dennis' daughter, causing the elder Rabbitt to drink heavily and quarrel with his wife. In the mid-1980s, Rabbitt's business began to decline, and he experienced difficulties. In 1989, his wife filed for divorce after accusing him of being unfaithful.

== Exposure ==
Rabbitt again came to the police's attention in mid-1998, after his van was stopped near I-44 in Daviess County during a routine check-up. During the check, it was discovered that his van's license plate was registered to another vehicle, after which Rabbitt was charged with theft and issued a ticket. On that evening, Rabbitt was spying on a woman in Fenton when he was seen by a neighbor, who scared him away and attempted to chase him down. While Rabbitt managed to flee in his van, his pursuer reported the incident to police and provided them with an accurate description of the voyeur and his van's license plate. A few days later, Rabbitt was spotted by traffic officers near Pacific, where he had raped a pregnant woman that evening.

On October 29, 1998, Rabbitt was apprehended by police officers on suspicion of committing multiple burglaries and rapes attributed to the "Southside Rapist". The investigators had been investigating the supposed criminal since 1992, attributing at least 22 rapes of girls and women between the ages of 14 and 82 since 1988 to him.

In at least 16 cases, the rapist's biological traces were found on the victims' bodies, from which DNA is isolated - no such traces were found in the remaining other six cases. After he was apprehended, Rabbitt was ordered to provide a saliva sample. Because the test results would not be available until four weeks later, authorities had to temporarily release him, as, up until that point, no physical evidence tied him to the crimes. Once he was released, Rabbitt left St. Louis and went into hiding.

Once the DNA results were returned in late November, it was discovered that Rabbitt's genotypic profile matched that of the Southside Rapist, and an arrest warrant was issued for him. On November 3, he was spotted at the American Motor Inn in Springfield, where he remained for approximately four days, before being seen watching a football game at the Faurot Field in Columbia. After the game, he left the city and went to Osage Beach, where he was recorded on a surveillance camera entering a convenience store. He was last seen checking into a motel in Joplin on November 8, after which he crossed the border into Oklahoma and his tracks were lost.

A search operation involving the FBI was organized to catch Rabbitt, with the authorities offering a $25,000 reward for any information on his whereabouts. During the operation, the homes of his family and friends were wiretapped. In mid-January 1999, the investigation team detected a call to the house of one of Rabbitt's friends, which was determined to have originated from a gas station in Pevely. However, they failed to locate him after a subsequent search of the area.

== Arrest ==
Dennis Rabbitt was arrested at a motel in Albuquerque, New Mexico on February 28, 1999, while local police were searching for a 15-year-old runaway girl. Based on a witness' testimony, the girl was found in the room where Rabbitt was staying under an assumed name, and after law enforcement attempted to question him, he tried to flee and was immediately arrested. During questioning, Rabbitt admitted to raping numerous women since 1973, giving dates for crimes he had never even been suspected in. Although he was found in the company of a 15-year-old girl, Albuquerque police did not charge him with any crime, leading to his immediate extradition to Missouri to face charges there. He pleaded not guilty on 10 counts of sexual assault.

During interrogations, Rabbitt testified that his first attempted rape took place in 1973. He claimed that the victims' age, appearance and personality traits were irrelevant to him, and that during the assaults, he would use a bright flashlight and imitated the behaviors and speech patterns of police officers. Because of this tactic, several officers were listed as potential suspects during the investigation and were ordered to provide DNA samples.

Rabbitt admitted to being extremely disorganized, and in instances, he either fled due to violent resistance from his victims, restricted himself to simply peeping on them or stealing valuables from the houses. He insisted that his main motive for the rapes was burgling into the houses, which several of his victims indirectly corroborated, stating that he lost sexual interest or had erectile problems quite quickly.

== Trial ==
Rabbitt was charged with 49 counts of sodomy, rape and robbery, and in January 2000, he pleaded guilty on all counts, admitting responsibility in 14 rapes committed between September 1988 and May 1997 in St. Louis, Jefferson and St. Charles counties. He was also suspected of two rapes in Collinsville, Illinois, but was never charged in them. For his confirmed crimes, Rabbitt was given five life terms.

== See also ==
- List of serial rapists
