= Murder of Michele LeAnn Morgan =

1961 death in Illinois

Michele LeAnn Morgan
- Born: Michele LeAnn Morgan; July 20, 1957; Mascoutah, Illinois
- Died: August 11, 1961 (aged 4); Mascoutah, Illinois
- Cause of death: Beating
- Resting place: O'Fallon City Cemetery, O'Fallon, Illinois
- Known for: Being a victim of child abuse resulting in death
- Parent(s): Bill Morgan (father); Mary "Rae" Morgan (stepmother)

Michele LeAnn Morgan (July 20, 1957–August 11, 1961) was a victim of child abuse who was murdered by her stepmother when she was four years old. Her story was documented on an episode of Cold Case Files.

== Abuse ==
Michele suffered multiple injuries to the chest and back, a broken nose, burns on her skin, and a broken arm before the age of four at the hands of her stepmother, Mary Rae. These led to over 20 visits to a hospital, including one in which she was hospitalized for a month.

== Murder ==
On August 9, 1961, Mary held Michele under water and stomped her violently, believing that the child had lied about something. Michele's older brother, George, witnessed these actions. At dinner, Michele vomited blood clots. The next day she died of her internal injuries. An autopsy was conducted by the pathologist at Scott Air Force Base, Illinois, near where the Morgans lived and Michele's father, a USAF airman, was stationed; the cause of death was found to be massive trauma to the chest.

The autopsy report was not completed until 15 years later, when the coroner listed the cause of death as pneumonia. The local prosecutor never pursued the case.

== Disclosure ==
In 1996, George Morgan, who is Michele's older brother, was serving time in prison for rape. That year, he decided to research his family genealogy and was surprised when he saw his sister's death certificate. He recalled the circumstances surrounding her death and was certain that it was not caused by pneumonia—and that it had occurred in 1961, not in 1976.

Morgan then corresponded with County Coroner Rick Stone and disclosed to him how Michele's death really occurred. Stone subsequently reopened the case and Michele's body was exhumed. Though the body had been buried for over 30 years, it still showed the marks of brutal child abuse. Investigators discovered the original autopsy report and Michele's hospital record, which showed multiple visits. George Morgan's claims were thus substantiated.

== Prosecution ==
Mary Morgan was tracked down in West Columbia, Texas, and initially denied the allegations leveled against her. She then attempted to flee the country but was caught and placed under arrest. Mary eventually pleaded guilty to involuntary manslaughter, was sentenced to five years in prison, and was released in 2001.

In the years after Michele's death, Mary raised four children. Hospital records showed that the four of them had collectively visited the hospital over 150 times for medical care before the age of five.

== See also ==
- List of murdered American children
