= Richard Alexander =

Richard Alexander may refer to:

- Richard Alexander (TV presenter) (active since 2003), British actor and TV presenter
- Richard Alexander (British politician) (1934–2008), Conservative British politician
- Richard Alexander (exonerated convict), 1998 wrongfully convicted American
- Richard Alexander (actor) (1902–1989), character actor
- Richard Alexander (field hockey) (born 1981), English field hockey defender
- Richard D. Alexander (1929–2018), professor and zoologist
- Richard Jay-Alexander (born 1953), Broadway producer and director
- Richard L. Alexander (1914–1993), American pilot
- Richard Thomas Alexander (1887–1971), American educator and education theorist
- Richard Dykes Alexander (1788–1865), businessman and philanthropist
- Dick Alexander (active since 1975), American sound engineer
