= The Weird World of Blowfly =

The Weird World of Blowfly may refer to:

- The Weird World of Blowfly (album), a 1973 album by Blowfly
- The Weird World of Blowfly (film), a 2010 documentary film about Clarence Reid, a/k/a Blowfly
