= Forensic Files season 7 =

Forensic Files
- Season 7
- No. of episodes: 42

Release
- Original network: Court TV
- Original release: October 12, 2002 – July 26, 2003

Season chronology
- ← Previous; Season 6 Next → Season 8

Forensic Files is an American documentary-style series which reveals how forensic science is used to solve violent crimes, mysterious accidents, and even outbreaks of illness. The series was broadcast on Court TV, narrated by Peter Thomas, and produced by Medstar Television, in association with Court TV Original Productions. It has broadcast 406 episodes since its debut on TLC in 1996 as Medical Detectives.

== Episodes ==
No. overall	No. in season	Title	Original release date
102	1	"The Cheater"	October 12, 2002
Details the death of Walter Scott, lead singer for the 1960s band Bob Kuban and the In-Men who disappeared on December 27, 1983. James H. Williams Sr. was later arrested and convicted of the murder of Scott and the earlier murder of his wife, Sharon.
103	2	"Forever Hold Your Peace"	January 8, 2002
An examination of an unusual case in Austin, Texas involving the October 24, 1988 rape and murder of Nancy DePriest, while at work at Pizza Hut. After suspect Chris Ochoa confessed and implicated Richard Danzinger and they were imprisoned, the case was considered closed. Newly emerging, though still low quality, DNA evidence implicated Ochoa as "possible" perpetrator. Eight years later, Achim Marino confessed to the same crime. Ochoa, who had been denied an attorney and confessed to avoid a threatened death sentence, was cleared by advanced DNA evidence, which also proved that Marino was, in fact, the perpetrator.
104	3	"Reel Danger"	January 15, 2002
The 1991 investigation into a brutal attack on two boys, whose real names were redacted to protect their identities, near a pond in Waterford, Connecticut relied on evidence fished out of the murky water. It was the first case where diatom evidence was used to place a suspect at the scene of the crime and references the subsequent case from the Season 2 episode "Micro-Clues", which also used diatom evidence. The evidence helped in the conviction of Christopher Green and Brian Davis, who were both 17 years old and were tried as adults and sent to prison. Their 16-year-old accomplice, referred to as "Jason", was sent to a juvenile detention center.
105	4	"Who's Your Daddy"	November 2, 2002
In 1988, the body of 32-year-old divorcee Margie Coffey was discovered in a frozen Ohio river; she had been strangled with her scarf. Most of the evidence found at the crime scene had been washed away. But the DNA of Coffey's 6-year-old son Brandon unwittingly told investigators all they needed to know about the killer, who was found to be police lieutenant Charles Oswalt. Oswalt had fathered Brandon, and had murdered Coffey in order to keep his wife from discovering his infidelity after Coffey refused to accept hush money payments. Oswalt was convicted of voluntary manslaughter and sentenced to a minimum of 18 years.
106	5	"The Alibi"	January 29, 2002
In 1991, a high school girl, Crystal Faye Todd of Conway, South Carolina, vanished after attending a party. Her abandoned car was found in a school parking lot, and her corpse was later found in a field; she had been raped and then stabbed multiple times on the night of her disappearance. The prime suspect was Todd's best friend Ken Register, who was known for his explosive temper; he had two alibi witnesses for the night of her murder. Forensic evidence, though, proved to be another matter; Register was convicted of the crime in South Carolina's first use of DNA testing in a criminal case, and was sentenced to life plus 48 years.
107	6	"A Bite Out of Crime"	February 5, 2002
In 1997, two years after a series of unsolved kidnappings and sexual assaults in Visalia, California, one of the victims suddenly recalled an important detail of the crime which she had not told police. She left some forensic evidence in the assailant's vehicle, evidence that left quite an impression.
108	7	"Purr-fect Match"	February 12, 2002
An examination of the first time animal DNA was used to solve a criminal case. In 1994 on Canada's Prince Edward Island, the body of Douglas Beamish's estranged wife Shirley Duguay was discovered. Authorities linked 20 cat hairs found on her jacket to a cat owned by Beamish's parents, with whom he lived. Scientists estimated that chances that the hairs came from another feline were one in 50 million. A jury later convicted Beamish of second-degree murder; he was sentenced to 18 years without parole.
109	8	"Bio-Attack"	November 30, 2002
1984 Rajneeshee bioterror attack: Investigators uncovered a plot to overthrow the local government, after a unique strain of salmonella made people ill.
110	9	"A Shot in the Dark"	December 7, 2002
A woman was shot to death in 1984. Not sure if it was a homicide or a suicide, it took the expertise of forensic experts and two jury trials to determine the fate of the accused killer.
111	10	"Without a Prayer"	December 14, 2002
Madalyn Murray O'Hair, the founder of American Atheists, one of her sons and granddaughter disappeared in 1995, along with $500,000 in gold coins. In time, the police homed in on several suspects, including David R. Waters, who worked as the office manager for O'Hair's organization. In 2001, he led authorities to her grave, located on a ranch near San Antonio. For his cooperation, Waters was only sentenced to 80 years in prison for his role in the crime, while his accomplice was sentenced to life.
112	11	"A Clutch of Witnesses"	December 21, 2002
Two eyewitnesses seemingly held the key to the January 2001 disappearance of motorcycle gang member Erik Schrieffer in Duluth, Minnesota. Joseph Arden Wehmanen later pleaded guilty to murder and was sentenced to 20 years.
113	12	"Scout's Honor"	March 19, 2003
Pennsylvania, 1984, the torso of a woman was found in a cardboard box. The original analysis of insect larvae by a forensic entomologist led to faulty time of death. The body was identified a year later, when Edna M. Posey was reported missing. Investigators then looked into Donald Ruby, whom Posey had asked to watch her 11-year-old son on the day Posey supposedly died. Prosecutors theorized that Donald Ruby was a pedophile who killed Edna to keep her from taking her son back, and were allowed to present this unfounded theory at trial which – coupled with the faulty entomology – prejudiced the jury into convicting Ruby for murder. Six years later, proper forensic entomology, in addition to proper forensic analysis regarding the motility of the sperm in Posey – proven to be from three men who were not Ruby – proved that Posey was killed a full day after the original conclusion, at a time when Ruby had solid alibis.
114	13	"A Touching Recollection"	March 26, 2003
The investigation into the May 2000 kidnapping and rape of an 18-year-old Ohio woman was aided when the victim returned hours after the incident occurred. With her attention to detail while enduring the crime, the police were able to track the assailant Craig Bailey to his front door. Bailey was sentenced to 46 years in prison.
115	14	"A Leg to Stand On"	January 11, 2003
In 1992, the police investigated when a severed leg was discovered in the garbage. Conventional means of identifying the victim were impossible, leading investigators to rely on DNA, forensic anthropology and toxicology to identify the victim. The victim was identified as Norman Klaas and, through forensic investigation of his home, it was determined that local meth dealer Graham King was the murderer. Klaas had been sleeping with King’s girlfriend and gotten her pregnant, and when King found out, he shot Klaas in a jealous rage and dismembered the body. However, King's friend Troy Philips was outside and overheard the murder, and his testimony sealed the deal. The case ultimately never went to trial; King pleaded guilty to second-degree murder and was sentenced to 20 years in prison.
116	15	"Partners in Crime"	January 18, 2003
How Illinois scientists solved a 1992 murder case involving cremation. It took a long time and a very hot fire to cremate a human body, and thus destroyed all evidence of foul play. The coroner who performed the autopsy on the badly burned body of Charles "Jack" Lynch found telltale clues. Not only had the victim been burned, he had also been stabbed 24 times, with two different knives. Police knew that a person, acting alone, would probably use only one weapon. So investigators were on the lookout for a couple of killers.
117	16	"Within a Hair"	August 31, 2002
A look back at the case of the River Park Rapist, who assaulted four women in South Bend, Indiana in 1996. Law enforcement officers arrested Richard Alexander, who was convicted in 1998 and sentenced to 70 years in prison. In 2001, Michael Murphy confessed to one of the two rapes of which Alexander had been convicted and new DNA testing fully exonerated Alexander of all rape convictions.
118	17	"Chief Evidence"	July 24, 2002
The 1996 Seattle murder of suburban couple Raquel Rivera and Jay Johnson is detailed. Investigators first believed the slayings were the result of a drug deal gone bad. However, no drugs were found in the house and the victims' blood was not present on the clothing of the suspects. Evidence from the couple's dog Chief eventually tied one of the murderers to the scene. This was one of the first cases where dog DNA was used to convict. Kenneth Leuluaialii and George Tuilefano were sentenced to life in prison without parole.
119	18	"A Bitter Pill to Swallow"	September 12, 2002
The story of firefighter Michelle Baker is related. After meeting Dr. Maynard Muntzing, she became pregnant by him in 2000. After this news, she was ill whenever they were together. The coincidences led her to suspect that he was doing her harm, so she set out to prove it. She eventually confirmed he had poisoned her to cause her to miscarry. Muntzing was stripped of his medical license and sentenced to five years in jail.
120	19	"Sip of Sins"	February 15, 2003
A look back at a trio of unsolved murders that occurred in Wichita Falls, Texas from 1984 to 1986, details how a fourth murder from the same time period provided the police with more than they realized. John Little, an investigator for the DA's office, picked up the cold cases years later. He soon connected the fourth crime's confessed killer, Faryion Wardrip, to the other murders.
121	20	"Telltale Tracks"	August 27, 2002
The June 20, 1996 disappearance of Philadelphia college athlete Aimee Willard was investigated after her car was found, still running on the roadside. When her body was found, the police found unusual marks on her body and DNA evidence that eventually lead to her killer, Arthur Bomar, who was later sentenced to death.
122	21	"Ghost in the Machine"	March 1, 2003
The investigation into the apparent overdose suicide of Reverend Bill Guthrie's wife Sharon on May 14, 1999 in Wolsey, South Dakota. Detectives suspected foul play after they recover incriminating files from Bill's computer and learn of his infidelity. When it was confirmed that Bill had written the suicide note, investigators managed to prove he murdered Sharon, and he was sentenced to life in prison.
123	22	"Frozen in Time"	March 8, 2003
The June 2, 1991 disappearance of Newport Beach, California resident Denise Huber stumped investigators. Three years later, Prescott Valley, Arizona residents called police to report John Famalaro, who kept a Ryder rental truck in his driveway, which they suspected was stolen. Upon further investigation, police found a body within a freezer inside the truck, which they concluded was Huber.
124	23	"Cold Storage"	March 15, 2003
The August 8, 1987 disappearance of Houston resident Tracy Jo Shine is recalled. The investigation went cold until 2000, when a cold case squad learned that Shine's ex-boyfriend, Michael Neal, had bragged about killing her. Though investigators never found Shine's body, they managed to convict Neal regardless, and he was sentenced to 35 years.
125	24	"The Metal Business"	September 26, 2002
In 1997, Phillip Rouss, who ran a car restoration shop, believed that his business partner, Steve A. White, was trying to kill him. Investigators were skeptical at first, but after some investigation, they discovered it was true; White was deeply in debt, so he poisoned Rouss to take over the business and sell it. White was sentenced to 30 years in prison for attempted murder.
126	25	"Dressed to Kill"	March 29, 2003
The May 31, 1986 disappearance of 6-year-old Michelle Lee Dorr is detailed. Although her father confessed to murdering her, the police soon poked holes in his story, leaving the case unsolved for 14 years. New suspect Hadden Clark, the killer from "Beaten by a Hair", was heard talking to himself, which gave investigators a clue where Michelle was killed.
127	26	"Palm Print Conviction"	June 25, 2002
The 1996 investigation into 48-year-old Martha Hansen's murder in Anchorage, Alaska was helped by a legal requirement of bars having video cameras installed on the premises. Using video, hair and blood evidence, investigators determined that Evans Lee Curtis was the murderer. Curtis tried to make a pass at Hansen while walking her home from a bar, but when she rejected him, they fought and he beat her to death. Curtis was sentenced to 99 years in prison.
128	27	"A Vow of Silence"	October 10, 2002
A look at the case against Jack Reeves. In October 1994, friends reported his mail-order bride Emelita Villa had disappeared. Police in Arlington, Texas centered their suspicions on Reeves and, while pursuing leads, uncovered information linking him to the deaths of two former wives.
129	28	"Elephant Tracks"	October 17, 2002
The 1996 murders of an elderly couple, 72-year-old Edward Kowalczk and 69-year-old Gertrude Thompson, left police stumped until two years later, they received a major break. A jeweler looking through old newspaper clippings recognized a necklace the female victim wore as having been pawned in her own shop. Police followed up on this tip, which eventually led them to James Jordan. While Kowalczk was away, Jordan killed Thompson with the intention of robbing the house, but was forced to kill Kowalczk as well when the latter arrived home in the middle of the burglary. Jordan was convicted of two counts of aggravated murder and was sentenced to death.
130	29	"A Bag of Evidence"	April 26, 2003
The April 5, 1996 murder of 9-year-old Jessica Knott was investigated. Investigators used a garbage bag to connect suspect James Edward Crow, Jr. to the crime.
131	30	"Tooth or Consequences"	May 3, 2003
An investigation into the May 26, 1999 murder of Katie Poirier was stymied by the lack of a body, but they found a few charred remains including a tooth. The tooth's filling contained unique properties that helped investigators identify her remains. Further forensic evidence was then used to convict Donald Blom of her murder.
132	31	"The Sniffing Revenge"	May 10, 2003
When 46-year-old Janet Overton died suspiciously in 1988, the investigation hit a dead end when the autopsy indicated that no foul play was involved. But a telephone tip and the sensitive nose of a forensic examiner indicated otherwise. Janet had been repeatedly cheating on her husband, 59-year-old Richard, and when he finally had enough, he poisoned her with cyanide, having tried to kill his first wife the same way 10 years earlier. Richard eventually confessed to the murder and was sentenced to life.
133	32	"Sleight of Hand"	May 17, 2003
The suspect in the March 13, 1981 murder of Enid Whittlesey in her California home eluded arrest for 17 years because the police could not tie him to it. That changed, however, when investigators learned the culprit was left-handed, putting a new spin on old facts leading to the arrest and conviction of Carl Stewart.
134	33	"Scratching the Surface"	May 24, 2003
Forensic scientists worked with the only clue recovered from an October 1993 multiple-victim shooting at Aircraft Modular Products in Miami: a 12-gauge shotgun. The shooting killed Miguel Garcia, while Douglas Zamora and Ray Cruz barely survived. Miraculously, Jorge Sanchez and George Moussa escaped unscathed. Police initially considered possible gang motivations, but eventually discovered that disgruntled employee Gerardo Manso was the shooter.
135	34	"Fire Proof"	May 31, 2003
Relates the story of Paul Kenneth Keller, a serial arsonist responsible for several fires that caused millions of dollars' worth of property damage and the deaths of three people from 1992 to 1993. More than 75 Seattle-area arsons were probed before he was discovered, partly through the use of forensic hypnosis.
136	35	"X Marks the Spot"	June 7, 2003
The use of the computers by law enforcement is detailed in this look at a series of crimes in St. Louis that stumped the local police and the FBI, which led to the capture of serial killer Maury Travis.
137	36	"All Charged Up"	December 10, 2002
Details the case of Philadelphia's Center City Rapist, who was active from 1997 to 1999, and the murder of Shannon Schieber on May 7, 1998. Authorities used an anonymous letter and geographic profiling to home in on a suspect who attacked victims who lived on upper floors of apartment buildings. In 2001, when they heard of similar crimes in Fort Collins, Colorado, they did further profiling to find Troy Graves, who left the Philadelphia area when he joined the U.S. Air Force.
138	37	"Breaking the Mold"	December 11, 2002
A family in Dripping Springs, Texas seemed to be living the perfect life when suddenly their 3-year-old son, Reese Allison, developed a respiratory condition in March 1999. The child's mother, Melinda Ballard, also had unusual symptoms. The child's father, Ron Allison, was later shown to have signs of Alzheimer's disease. While boarding a plane a month later, Ballard met an investigator who revealed that their ill health was due to a form of black mold in their modern home, which was based on the movie version of "Tara", the home of Scarlett O'Hara in Gone with the Wind.
139	38	"House Call"	June 28, 2003
The investigation into the murder of Dr. Louis Davidson in St. Petersburg, Florida crossed jurisdictions from New York to Jamaica. The police relied on cell phone mapping, wiretapping and a host of forensic evidence to link a suspect to a murder. The victim's wife, Denise, and the two hitmen, Robert Gordon and Meryl Stanley "Tony" McDonald, were convicted for the conspiracy. Davidson's boyfriend, Leonardo Anselmo "Leo" Cisneros, remains at large.
140	39	"Marathon Man"	July 5, 2003
In 2000, Robert Doritik's body was discovered near his family's horse ranch. His wife, Jane, claimed he went jogging, but investigators doubted her story. They eventually discovered that the marriage was falling apart, and California law stated that because Jane made more money, she had to pay Robert alimony if they divorced, which would financially ruin the ranch. Jane drugged Robert with horse tranquilizer while he slept the night before his disappearance, beat him to death, and dumped his body along his jogging route. At trial, Jane tried to pin the murder on her daughter and the daughter's boyfriend, but this ultimately failed and she was sentenced to 25 years in prison.
141	40	"The Sniper's Trail"	July 12, 2003
Details the case of the October 2002 Beltway sniper attacks, a three-week shooting spree which left 10 people dead in the Washington, D.C. area.
142	41	"Plastic Fire"	July 19, 2003
Omega, Georgia resident Sheila Bryan, who was convicted of killing her 82-year-old mother in a car fire that occurred on August 18, 1996, was granted a new trial. An expert fire witness shared an opinion on how the fire ignited that differed from the prosecution's theory and, if verified, would clear Bryan of any culpability.
143	42	"Last Will"	July 26, 2003
Authorities in Lexington County, South Carolina tracked a kidnapper who allowed his victim, 17-year-old Shari Smith, to write a last will and testament on a note pad, then informed the family of her murder, as well as the later murder of a 10-year-old Debra May Helmick. Both murders occurred in 1985. A phone number written on a previous page left a lasting impression, which helped to convict Larry Gene Bell.
