= The Cheater (song) =

Single by Bob Kuban and the In-Men

from the album Look Out for the Cheater
- B-side: "Try Me Baby"
- Released: October 1965
- Genre: Pop rock
- Length: 2:39
- Songwriter: Mike Krenski

Bob Kuban and the In-Men singles chronology
"The Cheater" (1965)	"The Teaser" (1966)

"The Cheater" is a song written by Mike Krenski, and performed by Bob Kuban and the In-Men that was released in October 1965. The band's lead singer Walter Scott received billing on the recording ("Vocal by Walter Scott"), which was produced by Mel Friedman. It features on their 1966 album Look Out for the Cheater.

== Background and composition ==
"The Cheater" is 2 minutes and 39 seconds, has a tempo of 136 beats per minute. The intro begins in E♭ minor, with the verses beginning in the key of G♭ major, changing to G major and again to A♭ major throughout the song, with the chorus ending in F minor, with an A♭ major chord in the guitar. Walter Scott's vocals range from Eb^{3} to C^{5}. On the B-side is a song titled "Try Me Baby."

The content of the song describes the story of a man, known as 'the cheater' who will 'build up' a relationship with someone's significant other before 'letting them down' by lying, betraying and mistreating them, a notorious 'fool-hearted clown' who is apparently warned about by people every day to the extent where people are staying in their houses. Eventually, the cheater steals the narrator's lover and the narrator is determined to get her back. The narrator foresees a day that the cheater finds true love of his own before it all falls apart, and the people who find out are laughing and making fun of him.

"The Cheater" was the In-Men's first and only hit. They had planned to tour in Australia, but there were draft deferment rules in the midst of the Vietnam War that prevented them from doing so. The manager, Mel Friedman had an agenda of his own that did not involve the band, and thus the band was forcefully split apart from each other following two singles that scraped the pit of the Hot 100, "The Teaser" and a cover of The Beatles' "Drive My Car."

Nearly 20 years after their dissolution, the band was preparing for a big reunion concert before Walter Scott mysteriously disappeared in December 1983. Scott was tied up, shot in the back, and thrown into a cistern where his decomposed body was finally found in 1987. Eventually, the boyfriend of Scott's second wife was found guilty of his murder, as well as his own wife's, and was given two life sentences. It was seen by many as a cruel irony that saw Scott meeting his untimely end in the way that he did, considering the context of The Cheater.

The song was parodied by Blowfly's as "The Eater", which was featured on his 1973 album The Weird World of Blowfly.

== Reception and chart success ==
"The Cheater" was the In-Men's first record, and only top 40 hit, peaking at number 12 on the Billboard Hot 100. In Canada in reached number 37. It was also certified Gold by the RIAA, and earned them a spot in the Rock and Roll Hall of Fame's permanent exhibit on one-hit wonders. In Canada a second single, "The Teaser", reached number 65.

The AllMusic review of "The Cheater" describes it as "something of a blue-eyed soul flavor with the vibrant horn arrangements and Scott’s almost black vocal approach." It was described in Cashbox magazine as a "potent, medium-paced, harmonic tune backed with a strong, steady beat" that has a "good dance sound and lyrics." The song may also be remembered for being an exception at the peak of the British Invasion. In an interview with Kuban that is featured in the book So, Where'd You Go to High School? Vol. 2, author Dan Dillon calls the group "a clean-cut counterpoint to the scores of the long-haired groups cashing in on the phenomenal success of the Beatles."
