= Murder of Shirley Duguay =

Use of non-human DNA in a criminal trial

Shirley Duguay
- Born: Shirley Ann Duguay; October 11, 1962
- Disappeared: October 3, 1994 (aged 32); Prince Edward Island
- Body discovered: North Enmore, Prince Edward Island (May 6, 1995)
- Spouse: Douglas Beamish

Shirley Ann Duguay (October 11, 1962 – October 3, 1994) was a Canadian woman from Prince Edward Island who went missing in 1994 and was later found dead in a shallow grave.

Among the most compelling pieces of evidence in the case was a leather jacket covered in Duguay's blood and over two dozen white feline hairs, marking the world's first use of non-human DNA in a criminal trial.

== Disappearance and investigation ==
On 7 October 1994, a car was found abandoned on Highway 169, near Tyne Valley in rural Prince Edward Island, with missing licence plates and apparent blood spatter on the windshield and throughout the vehicle's interior. The car belonged to Shirley Anne Duguay, a 32-year-old mother of five. Upon investigation, the Royal Canadian Mounted Police were told by Duguay's family that she had not been seen since October 3.

On 6 May 1995, Duguay's battered and partially decomposed body was discovered in a shallow grave in a wooded area of North Enmore. Her hands were tied behind her back and she had been strangled. Near the body, RCMP found a plastic bag containing a leather jacket covered in Duguay's blood and two strands of white feline hairs.

RCMP investigators recalled that during a previous interview with her estranged common-law spouse (and father to three of her children), Douglas Leo Beamish (born 1957) from Prince County, that he had a white cat named Snowball. The detectives obtained a sample of the cat's blood, intending to use DNA fingerprinting to compare it to the DNA found in the white hairs from the jacket, but they found that no one in the world had done this before.

After contacting the Laboratory of Genomic Diversity, a laboratory specializing in the study of genetic diseases rather than in forensics, detectives and scientists were able to develop a method to test the feline DNA. The test included a fail-safe method of randomly testing 20 other cats from Prince Edward Island, in order to establish the degree of genetic diversity among cats in the area, to rule out the possibility that the hairs found in the jacket came from a close relative of Snowball, or if all the cats on the island had a common ancestor, rendering the DNA test useless.

The tests revealed that the hairs did indeed come from the cat; Beamish was subsequently convicted for the murder of his wife. The Duguay case marked the world's first use of non-human DNA in a criminal trial; while the forensic science of testing cat and dog hairs had been firmly established and studied, it was an unknown science up until that point.

Convicted of second-degree murder, Beamish was sentenced to 18 years-to-life in prison on 19 July 1996, serving the life sentence in an Ontario prison. He appealed his conviction in 1998 and 1999, being rejected both times. His request for parole in 2013 was also denied. After serving 29 years on a life sentence, Beamish has been released from a federal prison as of July 2025 into a halfway house — with conditions which also includes that he not return to the province.

== Media ==
In an episode entitled "Purr-fect Match," Forensic Files outlined this story on February 12, 2002 (Episode 7 of Season 7). It was also told on The New Detectives on December 10, 2002, in episode 3 of season 8, "Material Witness."

== See also ==
- List of solved missing person cases
