= Blowfly's Punk Rock Party =

2006 album by Blowfly

Studio album by Blowfly
- Released: September 12, 2006
- Recorded: Tone Zone Studios, Miami, FL, February 21 to March 10, 2006
- Genre: Punk rock, parody
- Length: 63:47
- Label: Alternative Tentacles
- Producer: Tom Bowker

Blowfly chronology
Fahrenheit 69 (2005)	Blowfly's Punk Rock Party (2006)

Professional ratings
Review scores
Source	Rating
Allmusic	link

Blowfly's Punk Rock Party is the 2006 album by Blowfly and his second release for Jello Biafra's label Alternative Tentacles.

On this album numerous classics of the punk rock genre by artists such as the Ramones and the Dead Kennedys are given the Blowfly sex parody treatment, as well as one originally non-punk rock song parodied in punk style and several original songs. Jello Biafra makes a guest appearance on both versions of "R Kelly In Cambodia" as does Raf Classic from the Crumbs on "Should I Fuck This Big Fat Ho?" Six clean radio edits are also included.

== Reviews ==
Alternative Press gave the album 4 out of 5 stars.

== Cover art ==
The cover art of Punk Rock Party features cameos by Gidget Gein of Marilyn Manson, fetish model Courtney Cruz, burlesque dancer Summer Peaches, and sideshow performer Miss Satanica.

== Track listing ==
All tracks by Bowker, Chavez, Reid, Sherber

1. "Punk Cock is Rock" – 1:48
2. "Should I Fuck this Big Fat Ho" ("Should I Stay or Should I Go" by The Clash) – 2:44
3. "V.D. Party" ("TV Party" by Black Flag) – 3:38
4. "R. Kelly in Cambodia" (ft. Jello Biafra) ("Holiday in Cambodia" by The Dead Kennedys) – 3:17
5. "Suck and Fuck Train" ("Love Train" by The O'Jays) – 1:44
6. "Stick It Down Your Throat Bitch" ("Hit Me With Your Best Shot" by Pat Benatar) – 1:44
7. "I Wanna Fuck Your Dog" ("I Wanna Be Your Dog" by The Stooges) – 3:48
8. "Scumbag Fucker" – 3:06
9. "I Wanna Be a Sex Toy" ("All This and More" by The Dead Boys) – 2:10
10. "I Wanna Be Fellated" ("I Wanna Be Sedated" by The Ramones) – 2:04
11. "Suck It" ("Whip It" by Devo) – 1:45
12. "Destructo Cock" ("Destructo Rock" by Antiseen) – 1:44
13. "Fucked With a Dildo" ("Stuck In the Middle" by Rocket from the Crypt) – 0:56
14. "Gotta Keep Her Penetrated" ("Come Out and Play (Gotta Keep 'Em Separated)" by The Offspring) – 2:37
15. "Playing with Myself" ("Dancing with Myself" by Billy Idol) – 2:17
16. "R. Kelly in Cambodia (Not Guilty, Slight Return)" ("Holiday in Cambodia" by the Dead Kennedys) – 2:41
17. "Wild in the Sheets" (ft. Uncle Tom) ("Wild in the Streets" by the Circle Jerks) – 1:34
18. "Drenched in Cum" ("Drenched In Blood" by Turbonegro) – 3:12
19. "Punk Rock Party" – 2:02

All Ages Radio Edits:

20. "Should I Lay This Big Fat Ho" – 2:43
21. "R. Kelly in Cambodia" – 3:17
22. "V.D. Party" – 3:38
23. "I Wanna Be Fellated" – 2:04
24. "Playing With Myself" – 2:17
25. "R. Kelly in Cambodia" (Not Guilty, Slight Return) – 4:57

== Personnel ==
- Santanica Batcakes – Model
- Nikki Belyea – Model
- Jello Biafra – Vocals
- Tom Bowker – Choir, Chorus, Producer
- Heidi Calvert – Photography
- Captain Crabs – Vocals
- Sean Chambers – Choir, Chorus
- Chris Chavez – Choir, Chorus
- Courtney Cruz – Model
- Gidget Gein – Model
- Forrest Gimp – Guitar, Group Member
- Peter Harris – Choir, Chorus
- Pete Humphries – Mastering
- Larry Kay – Mastering
- Amy Pomerant – Vocals, Choir, Chorus
- Raf Classic – Vocals, Choir, Chorus
- David Roman – Choir, Chorus
- Rob Sherber – Choir, Chorus
- Summer Peaches – Model
- Shannon Thier aka "Sheigh Zam!" – Vocals, Choir, Chorus
- Uncle Tom – Vocals, Group Member
- Glenn Vance – Model
- Kunta Whytaye – Bass, Group Member
- Tracy Yauch – Engineer, Mixing
