= Grant Park, Illinois =

Grant Park
- Village
- Village of Grant Park
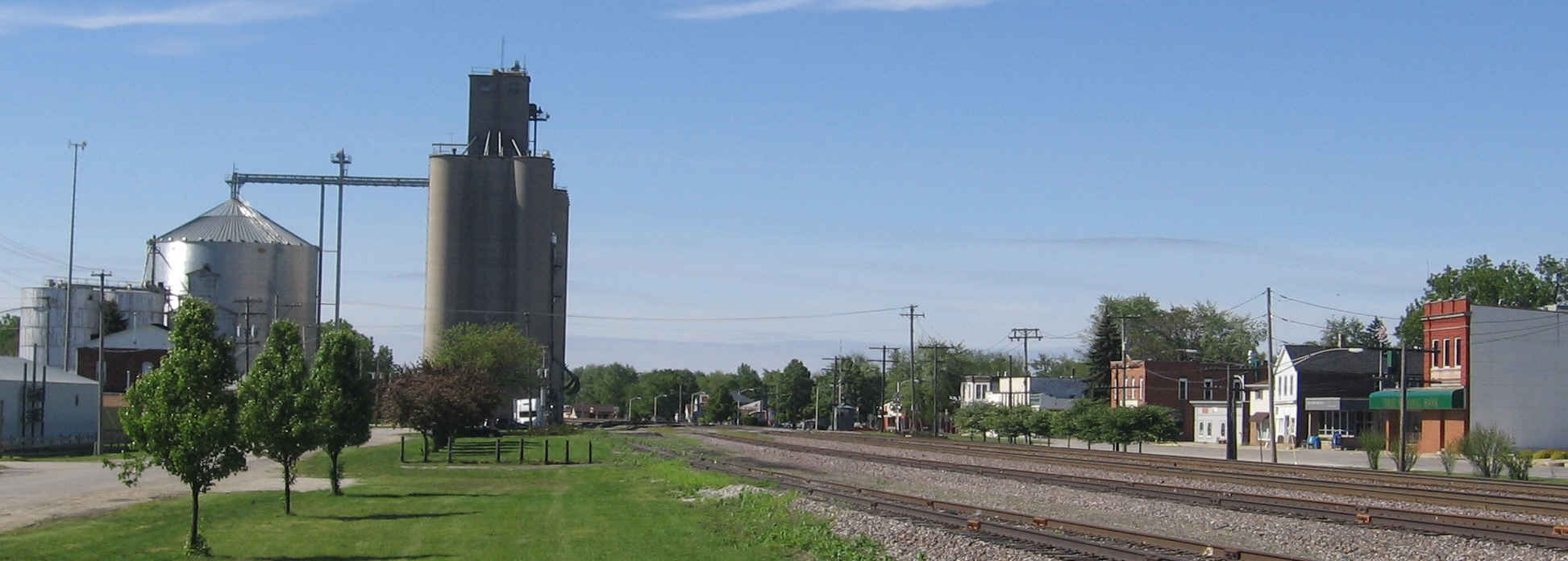
- Grant Park, Illinois, Looking South

- Location of Grant Park in Illinois

- Location of Illinois in the United States
- Coordinates: 41°14′35″N 87°38′07″W
- Country: United States
- State: Illinois
- County: Kankakee
- Established: 1883

Area
  - Total: 3.44 sq mi (8.90 km^{2})
  - Land: 3.41 sq mi (8.84 km^{2})
  - Water: 0.027 sq mi (0.07 km^{2})
- Elevation: 689 ft (210 m)

Population (2020)
  - Total: 1,294
  - Density: 379/sq mi (146.4/km^{2})
- Time zone: UTC-6 (CST)
  - Summer (DST): UTC-5 (CDT)
- ZIP Code: 60940
- Area codes: 815 and 779
- FIPS code: 17-30991
- GNIS feature ID: 2398191
- Website: www.grantpark-il.org

Grant Park is a village in northeastern Kankakee County, Illinois, United States. Grant Park was incorporated in 1883. As of the 2020 census, Grant Park had a population of 1,294. It is part of the Kankakee–Bradley Metropolitan Statistical Area. Much of the town was destroyed by a cyclone in 1912, according to Frank Leslie's Weekly magazine, which ran pictures.

== Geography ==
According to the 2021 census gazetteer files, Grant Park has a total area of 3.44 square miles (8.91 km^{2}), of which 3.41 square miles (8.83 km^{2}) (or 99.27%) is land and 0.03 square miles (0.08 km^{2}) (or 0.73%) is water.

=== Weather events ===
In 1912 a large tornado swept through grant park destroying several homes in the northern portion of the village, injuring multiple residents.

A second large scale tornado struck grant park April 7, 1948, killing 3, and injuring 8. Extensive damage to homes and livestock was done. this tornado is considered the worst tornado in the history of Kankakee County.

On April 7, 1954, a third tornado caused one fatality, and two minor injuries. Several millions of dollars in damage was done.

On August 10, 2020, a relatively small tornado touched down in Grant Park. It caused major damage to trees and roofs along its path, which ended just nearing Lake Metonga. This tornado formed from the bigger August 2020 Midwest derecho.

== Demographics ==
Historical population
Census	Pop.	Note	%±
1880	279		—
1890	340		21.9%
1900	442		30.0%
1910	692		56.6%
1920	459		−33.7%
1930	508		10.7%
1940	519		2.2%
1950	564		8.7%
1960	757		34.2%
1970	914		20.7%
1980	1,038		13.6%
1990	1,024		−1.3%
2000	1,358		32.6%
2010	1,331		−2.0%
2020	1,294		−2.8%
U.S. Decennial Census

=== 2020 census ===
As of the 2020 census, Grant Park had a population of 1,294. There were 371 families residing in the village. The population density was 376.38 inhabitants per square mile (145.32/km^{2}). The median age was 43.6 years. 21.3% of residents were under the age of 18 and 19.9% of residents were 65 years of age or older. For every 100 females there were 88.6 males, and for every 100 females age 18 and over there were 95.0 males age 18 and over.

0.0% of residents lived in urban areas, while 100.0% lived in rural areas.

There were 517 households in Grant Park, of which 28.8% had children under the age of 18 living in them. Of all households, 49.9% were married-couple households, 19.1% were households with a male householder and no spouse or partner present, and 24.8% were households with a female householder and no spouse or partner present. About 27.1% of all households were made up of individuals and 12.6% had someone living alone who was 65 years of age or older.

There were 550 housing units at an average density of 159.98 per square mile (61.77/km^{2}). Of all housing units, 6.0% were vacant. The homeowner vacancy rate was 0.5% and the rental vacancy rate was 13.3%.

Racial composition as of the 2020 census
Race	Number	Percent
White	1,172	90.6%
Black or African American	7	0.5%
American Indian and Alaska Native	2	0.2%
Asian	0	0.0%
Native Hawaiian and Other Pacific Islander	2	0.2%
Some other race	19	1.5%
Two or more races	92	7.1%
Hispanic or Latino (of any race)	96	7.4%

=== Income and poverty ===
The median income for a household in the village was $63,688, and the median income for a family was $75,114. Males had a median income of $48,456 versus $29,250 for females. The per capita income for the village was $24,845. About 5.1% of families and 6.7% of the population were below the poverty line, including 4.9% of those under age 18 and 5.7% of those age 65 or over.

== Education ==
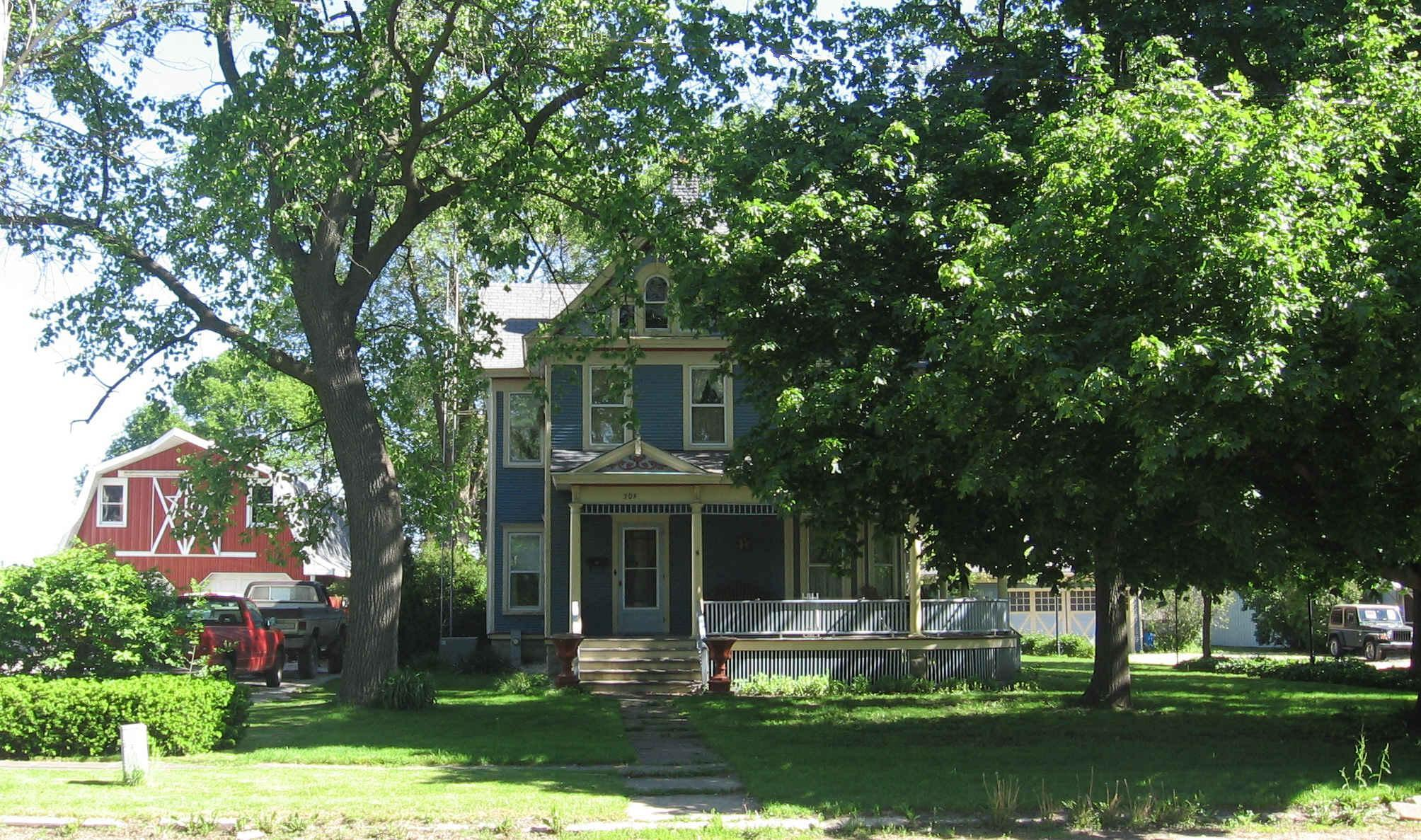
Esson Farms Road, Grant Park, Illinois

Grant Park contains a preschool, elementary school, middle school, and a high school. The mascot for the elementary school, middle school, and high school is the Dragons and the colors are green and gold.

The high school followed a block schedule in which students attend four 87-minute class periods a day, but is now going back to 8 hours a day and tray lunches.

== Notable people ==
- Richard L. Alexander, World War II fighter ace, was born here

== See also ==
- List of municipalities in Illinois
