= Troy Graves =

American murderer, serial rapist (born 1972)

- Graves' mugshot, 23 April 2002
- Born: May 4, 1972 (age 54); Minnesota, U.S.
- Occupations: Maintenance worker, U.S. Air Force airman
- Spouse: Amy Graves (m. 2001; div. 2004)
- Status: Incarcerated
- Convictions: First degree murder Rape
- Penalty: Life sentence

Details
- Imprisoned at: Sterling Correctional Facility

Troy Graves (born May 4, 1972) is an American murderer and serial rapist. He was known as the "Center City rapist" in Philadelphia, committed a series of rapes in from 1997 to 1999; during a 1998 rape, he also murdered his victim, Shannon Schieber. Graves left Philadelphia and eventually settled in Colorado where, in Fort Collins in 2001, he again committed a series of rapes. Following a joint investigation by law enforcement in both cities, they were able to find a link between Graves and his presence in both localities during the applicable time frames, with fingerprint and DNA evidence confirming his involvement. He was arrested in Fort Collins in April 2002, and within five weeks had pleaded guilty to crimes in both cities. He is serving a life sentence in the Sterling Correctional Facility in Sterling, Colorado.

== Early life ==
Troy was born to Earl and Michal Graves in Minnesota. He grew up in New York and Pennsylvania, living with his mother and older brother Marc, following his parents' divorce in 1986. He dropped out of Bensalem High School in 1989 and worked various jobs in the Philadelphia area while living in the neighborhoods of West Philadelphia and Center City.

His whereabouts were unknown throughout July–October 1999, when he reported for basic training at Lackland Air Force Base in Texas. Following training, he was assigned to F.E. Warren Air Force Base in Cheyenne, Wyoming in April 2000 as a maintenance worker on missile silos.

In March 2001, Graves was married in Larimer County, Colorado and the couple later settled into a home a few blocks west of the Colorado State University campus in Fort Collins.

== Criminal career ==
=== Philadelphia attacks ===
1. June 20, 1997: a woman on South 21st Street is the target of an attempted rape by a home intruder;
2. July 11, 1997: a woman on Pine Street was raped by a home intruder;
3. August 6, 1997: a woman on Pine Street was raped by a home intruder;
4. August 13, 1997: a woman on Pine Street was raped by a home intruder;
5. May 7, 1998: Wharton School doctoral student Shannon Schieber was raped and murdered by a home intruder;
6. August 28, 1999: a woman on Naudain Street was raped by a home intruder.

=== Fort Collins attacks ===
1. May 10, 2001: a woman on Raintree Drive was raped;
2. June 13, 2001: a woman on Raintree Drive was raped;
3. June 24, 2001: a woman on Battlecreek Drive was raped by a home intruder;
4. July 26, 2001: a woman on Prospect Road was raped by a home intruder;
5. August 5, 2001: a woman on University Avenue was raped by a home intruder;
6. August 23, 2001: a woman on Landings Drive was raped by a home intruder; she scared him away as he tried to attack her roommate.

=== Arrest and trial ===
On April 23, 2002, Fort Collins police arrested Graves for a series of six rapes near Colorado State University. Graves' DNA matched that of the Center City rapist and that left at Schieber's murder scene, a link made in May 2001 that had led law enforcement in both states to work together to create a list of individuals who had connections in Fort Collins and Philadelphia. Fort Collins authorities also linked Graves to at least one of the Colorado crimes through fingerprint evidence.

Graves pleaded guilty to the Fort Collins assaults on May 17, 2002, and to the Philadelphia crimes on May 30, 2002, in order to prevent a possible death sentence in Philadelphia. He was sentenced to life in prison without possibility of parole in Colorado and 60 to 120 years in prison in Pennsylvania, but will serve his time in Colorado because he pleaded guilty there first.

== Media ==
Television shows about the case include:

- Forensic Files, episode "All Charged Up", first aired December 10, 2002
- Dateline NBC, episode "Justice for Shannon", first aired March 4, 2003
- Cold Case drama series, influenced the plot of the episode "Our Boy Is Back", first aired October 12, 2003
- Cold Blood, episode "Philadelphia's Night Stalker", first aired May 17, 2012
- People Magazine Investigates, episode "Terror in Philadelphia", first aired November 12, 2018.
