= Murder of Louis Davidson =

1994 murder-for-hire of a doctor in St. Petersburg, Florida

- Louis Alexander Davidson
- Location: St. Petersburg, Florida, United States
- Date: January 25, 1994; 32 years ago
- Attack type: Murder for hire
- Deaths: Louis Davidson, 38
- Verdict: Guilty
- Convictions: Shore; Accessory after the fact Denise, Gordon and McDonald; First-degree murder
- Sentence: Shore; Probation; Denise; Life imprisonment Gordon, McDonald; Death
- Convicted: Meryl McDonald; Robert Gordon; Denise Davidson; Susan Shore

On January 25, 1994, 38-year-old Louis Alexander Davidson, a Jamaican doctor working at Bayfront Medical Center, was murdered by two men inside his apartment in St. Petersburg, Florida, and his body was discovered hogtied, beaten and drowned face down in the bathtub of his residence. The two hitmen, Meryl Stanley McDonald (born August 15, 1946) and Robert Roy Gordon (born November 25, 1962), were hired by Davidson's estranged wife Denise Ann Davidson (born February 17, 1960), who was in midst of a divorce lawsuit with her husband, and she plotted the murder after she found out she was pregnant with the baby of her newfound lover, in addition to a life insurance policy on her husband's life and their fight for full custody of their daughter.

The police identified five suspects, and arrested four of them: Denise, Gordon, McDonald and a second woman named Susan Carole Shore, and the four were all charged with first-degree murder. The fifth suspect was Denise's boyfriend, Leonardo Anselmo Cisneros (born March 9, 1962), but he was never caught and remains on the run as of today.

In the end, Shore was convicted of reduced charges of accessory after the fact and sentenced to probation. Denise, McDonald and Gordon were all found guilty of first-degree murder in separate trials: Denise was sentenced to life in prison, while the two men were sentenced to death.

== Background ==
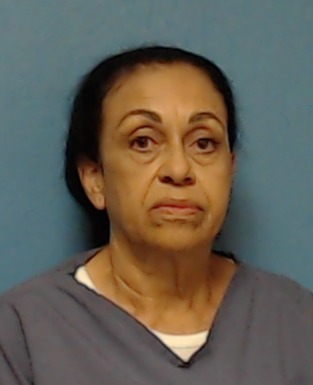
Denise Ann Davidson

Louis Alexander Davidson was born and raised in Kingston, Jamaica, where he studied medicine at the University of the West Indies, completing both his undergraduate education and medical training. He began his internship in Jamaica in 1979 and subsequently completed additional internships while working in private practice between August 1980 and July 1982. During this period, Davidson met his future wife, Denise Ann Davis. After several years of dating, the couple married on August 28, 1982.

Denise Davis, later known as Denise Davidson, was born in Jamaica on February 17, 1960. She was the third of seven children born to a British-born factory manager and a Jamaican mother who worked as a nurse and lecturer. After completing high school, Denise worked as a secretary at an insurance company. She also pursued modeling, appearing in swimsuit posters and calendars, and was a finalist in the Miss Jamaica beauty pageant.

One year after their marriage, in 1983, the couple immigrated to the United States and settled in Tampa, Florida, where their only child, a daughter, was born in 1985. Davidson initially worked as a surgical technician at a Miami hospital for a year before beginning a pediatrics residency at St. Petersburg All Children's Hospital. After obtaining his Florida medical license in February 1985, he entered medical practice and was later appointed chief of the pediatrics department at Bayfront Medical Center. Despite Davidson's professional success, the couple's marriage began to deteriorate by 1988. In January 1989, Denise moved out of the family home with their daughter. Six months later, she returned with the child, although the couple continued to live separately within the same house, sleeping in separate bedrooms.

In January 1990, Denise sought a court injunction for protection from her husband, alleging that Davidson had repeatedly struck her in the head, causing a concussion. She also accused him of abusing both her and their daughter. The following day, Davidson filed for divorce, alleging that Denise had engaged in multiple extramarital affairs and had previously posed for nude photographs. Denise denied the allegations. The couple reconciled in 1991 but separated again two years later. Davidson moved out of the marital home and into an apartment in northern St. Petersburg. In October 1993, he filed for divorce for a second time. A central issue in the proceedings was Denise's stated intention to return to Jamaica with their daughter, a move that Davidson strongly opposed.

During the separation, Denise began a relationship with nightclub owner Leonardo "Leo" Cisneros, while Davidson entered into a relationship with paramedic Patricia Dennino. Davidson and Dennino became engaged and they both planned to marry on Davidson's 39th birthday in July 1994 once the divorce was finalized, and he sought full custody of his daughter. A court-appointed psychologist determined Davidson had not abused his wife and daughter after examining him and the allegations, and was set to recommend that Davidson be granted full visitation rights to the girl, which Denise was strongly against, in an upcoming hearing in January 1994, the same month when Davidson was murdered.

== Murder ==
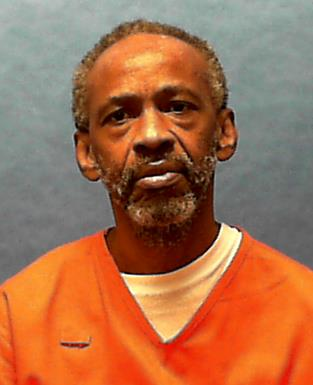
Robert Roy Gordon, one of the two men hired to kill Davidson.

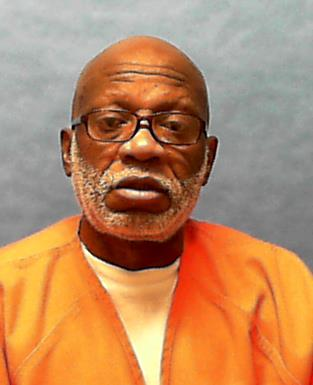
Meryl Stanley McDonald, one of the two men hired to kill Davidson.

While the Davidsons' divorce lawsuit was ongoing, Denise Davidson eventually discovered that she was pregnant with the child of her newfound lover Leo Cisneros, sometime after they began dating. Aside from this, Denise also found out that there was a $400,000 insurance policy for Louis Davidson's life, which promised a payment of $350,000 for Denise if her husband died before the divorce was finalized. This series of revelations, coupled by the divorce proceedings and custody dispute over the couple's daughter, eventually drove Denise to plot the murder of her husband.

Around late December 1993, as part of their planned attempt on Davidson's life, Denise and Cisneros hired two men to carry out the murder. The two men, 47-year-old Meryl Stanley McDonald and 31-year-old Robert Roy Gordon, were instructed by the couple that Davidson kept thousands of dollars stashed in his closet and hence they should rob him of the money and kill him. The couple made several trips from Miami to Tampa between late December 1993 and early January 1994 to meet with the pair to discuss and make preparations to facilitate the plot, including having a look at Davidson's workplace and apartment.

On January 24, 1994, McDonald and Gordon hired a British woman and acquaintance named Susan Carole Shore, seeking her help to drive them to Davidson's apartment, claiming they want to visit a friend living there and pick up a piece of paper. Shore agreed to help the duo, and she also met both Cisneros and Denise in Tampa afterwards. The next morning, on January 25, 1994, Shore drove Gordon and McDonald to Davidson's apartment in St. Petersburg, and they waited outside for Davidson to return home from his night shift at the Bayfront Medical Center. Subsequently, after Davidson arrived home, the duo alighted Shore's car and entered the building after Davidson while Shore remained outside waiting for the men.

After gaining entry into Davidson's apartment, the men attacked the 38-year-old doctor. Davidson was bound and hogtied by the pair, who used a cashmere belt and vacuum cleaner cord to bind his hands and feet. He was also gagged and blindfolded, and the pair assaulted and beat him on the head about eight to ten times, and during the assault, Davidson managed to free one of his hands from his bindings, only to have it tied up again. The victim also broke his ribs as a result of the beatings. Afterwards, Gordon and McDonald took Davidson to the bathroom, where he was placed face down in his own bathtub filled with water. Davidson died after he drowned face down in the bathtub. The two men stole Davidson's Seiko watch (which was initially mistaken for a Rolex), camera, and a money clip with several hundred dollars, before they left the apartment and rode Shore's car away from the scene. Evidence showed that shortly after the murder, Denise made trips under the false identity "Pauline White" to the Western Union, and made a total of 21 money transfers to the two men.

The body of Davidson was discovered by his fiancée on the afternoon of his murder. Although the apartment was ransacked, $19,300 in cash and some credit cards were still left inside the residence. The associate medical examiner, Dr. Marie Hansen, conducted an autopsy and certified that the cause of death was drowning. She also found bruises on Davidson's face and shoulders, lacerations on the back of the scalp and three broken ribs, which were consistent with blunt force trauma.

== Arrests and charges ==
The police conducted their investigations into the murder of Louis Davidson, and they theorized that the crime was neither a random one nor was it committed by a killer stalking the local residents. However, for three weeks after the murder, the police found little clues to solve the case by mid-February 1994.

On February 28, 1994, Robert Gordon was arrested in Miami after stepping off a city bus, and he was the first suspect to be apprehended and charged with the first-degree murder of Davidson. This was not the first time Gordon had been arrested; he was previously arrested for various offences like sexual battery against a minor and an adult, and buying stuff with worthless checks. Amongst the charges he faced, Gordon had been convicted twice: once for passing forged checks and once for marijuana possession, and he served short stints in prison for both these cases, while the sexual battery charges were dismissed due to the victims' refusal to cooperate during investigations.

On March 4, 1994, Denise Davidson was arrested at the Tampa International Airport, where she was set to board her flight back to Jamaica. After her capture, Denise was charged with the first-degree murder of her husband, and detained at the Pinellas County Jail pending investigation and trial.

On March 10, 1994, Susan Shore was placed on the wanted list for charges of first-degree murder, after she was identified as another suspect behind the murder-for-hire case, based on witness descriptions of a blond-haired woman sighted outside the apartment on the morning of Davidson's murder, which fitted the profile of Shore.

On March 22, 1994, Shore became the third suspect to be arrested for the murder of Davidson; she was caught in Jamaica after FBI agents traced her whereabouts to Port Royal, and Shore reportedly did not put up any resistance when she was located and caught by the local authorities. Within a week, Shore was extradited back to Florida, where she was formally charged in court with first-degree murder.

In April 1994, a grand jury formally indicted Denise, Gordon and Shore, as well as the last two missing suspects Meryl McDonald and Leo Cisneros, for charges of first-degree murder. Following the indictment, the authorities issued warrants of arrest for both Cisneros and McDonald. At that point, Cisneros had already fled the country and was last seen in Jamaica, but the police could not locate him in Jamaica when they obtained an arrest warrant, and his present whereabouts are unknown. McDonald was previously detained for investigations into Davidson's murder but a mistake in the paperwork led to his release, and he therefore escaped to New York.

On October 18, 1994, after spending nine months on the run, McDonald became the fourth suspect to be arrested. He was arrested at an apartment building in New York after two St. Petersburg police detectives, Randy Morton and Mike Celona, staked out for several days. McDonald was later sent back to Florida to face charges in Davidson's killing. Furthermore, McDonald was also suspected of killing Frederick "Juba" Maitland, a Jamaican hitman believed to have been previously hired by Denise to kill her husband before Gordon and McDonald accepted the task. Maitland's body was found tied up and weighted down in a Dade County lake on December 24, 1993.

As of 2026, Leo Cisneros, the fifth and last suspect, remains on the run for the murder of Louis Davidson.

== Trials ==
=== Susan Shore ===
On January 25, 1995, the first year anniversary of Louis Davidson's death, one of the suspects, Susan Shore, was released from prison without bail after she spent ten months in remand. Prior to her release, a plea bargain was reached between the prosecution and defence, and the former agreed to withdraw the murder charges against Shore and instead proceed with lower charges of accessory against her, in exchange for her testimony against her accomplices in their upcoming trials for the murder of Davidson. As a condition of her release, Shore was placed under house arrest, required to wear an electronic monitoring device, and prohibited from leaving the apartment where she was required to reside during the period of house arrest.

On September 27, 1995, Shore pleaded no contest to reduced charges of accessory after the fact. As part of the plea deal, Circuit Judge John C. Lenderman sentenced Shore to probation after accepting her plea, and the probation was to expire three days later on September 30, 1995, the same date Shore was set to fly back to Britain. According to Shore's family in London, they planned to dedicate a Mass to Davidson once Shore returned home.

=== Meryl McDonald and Robert Gordon ===
Meryl McDonald and Robert Gordon was the next to stand trial for the murder-for-hire of Louis Davidson in early June 1995.

During the trial, the prosecution contended that the men were responsible for murdering Davidson on the orders of his wife, and they presented witness testimony and forensic evidence linking Robert Gordon and Meryl McDonald to the murder. Motel employees testified that the pair were seen together at a Tampa Days Inn before and shortly after the killing, with Susan Shore renting their room under an alias. After they checked out, investigators recovered a gray sweatshirt and a pair of white sneakers from the room. FBI analysts testified that the sneakers matched a footprint found at the crime scene, while DNA testing identified Davidson's blood on the sweatshirt. The sweatshirt also contained carpet fibers consistent with those from Davidson's apartment, cashmere fibers similar to those from the belt used to bind his hands, and hair consistent with McDonald's head and beard hair. Prosecutors also alleged that McDonald's beeper had been paged 55 times from Denise's residence on the morning of the murder. Shore appeared in court as a witness, and testified that she was duped into joining the plot under the belief that the pair needed to get a paper from a friend who worked at a hospital, and hence followed them to Davidson's apartment.

On June 15, 1995, the jury found both men guilty of first-degree murder as charged. A sentencing trial was conducted before the same jury a day later, and during this hearing, the defence argued for both men to be sentenced to life imprisonment instead of death. Reports cited that McDonald's lawyers sought to convince the jury that with his age of 48, McDonald could only be eligible for parole at age 73 after completing the minimum 25-year period under a life sentence, and further argued that it was highly unlikely that McDonald would still be alive at that point, while Gordon's counsel summoned his sister and mother to testify for mercy on the stand. The prosecution sought the death penalty on the basis that the crime was premeditated and cruel, and the killing was committed with a financial motive and in the course of either robbery or burglary.

Ultimately, on June 16, 1995, after 90 minutes of deliberation, nine out of 12 jurors voted to impose the death penalty for both defendants, and a formal sentencing date of July 12, 1995, was scheduled. However, it was delayed due to legal reasons. During an August 1995 hearing, 1994, the defence counsel continued to argue against the death sentence. McDonald's lawyer Michael Schwartzberg submitted that given his client's age of 48 at the time of the trial, there was a guarantee that McDonald would die in prison naturally even when under a life sentence. Gordon's lawyer Charles Holloway argued that the victim was possibly unconscious at the time of his drowning, and hence there was no torture happened during the killing. In rebuttal, Assistant State Attorney Frank Schaub scoffingly stated that if Davidson was unconscious at that time, there was no need for the pair to tie, bind and gag him before killing him.

On November 17, 1995, both Gordon and McDonald were formally sentenced to death via the electric chair by Circuit Judge Susan Schaeffer. In delivering her verdict, Judge Schaeffer remarked that the pair had coldly and mercilessly executed their plot to kill Davidson, and hence they effectively forfeited their right to live aside from their right to live in society.

=== Denise Davidson ===
On September 2, 1995, Denise Davidson was officially put on trial for soliciting the murder of her husband. She was the fourth suspect, and till today, remains the last suspect to stand trial in this case. At the time of Denise's trial, she had already given birth to her second child, also a daughter, while in prison, and the baby girl was under the care of Denise's sister, who also took guardianship of the Davidsons' ten-year-old daughter.

During the trial, Denise outright denied having any motive or involvement in the murder of her husband. She denied that she paid the hitmen to kill her husband but claimed that Cisneros persuaded her to make the payments for shipping truck parts to Jamaica as part of an investment to double her money. She denied buying a phone that both Gordon and McDonald used and paying for their $3,000 phone bill, and instead stated it was a gift for Cisneros who told her that it was passed to a friend. Overall, Denise pinned the blame entirely on Cisneros and stated she was innocent. However, Shore testified in court that on the eve of Davidson's murder, both Cisneros and Denise had met McDonald at a citrus store where she worked, and later on, Denise had met up with the two hitmen at a Tampa motel an hour after they carried out the killing. Denise denied that she ever met the hitmen but claimed it was Cisneros who was meeting the people and she herself was only there to use the bathroom.

The prosecution presented various evidence and witnesses to discredit Denise's denials and defence. A detective testified that Denise had denied any knowledge about the $400,000 insurance policy on Davidson's life, but evidence showed that she conversed with a investment counselor about the payout. Denise's alibi at the time of the murder was also proven to be false. Despite her denial of knowing the hitmen, the prosecution obtained phone records showing that both McDonald and Gordon made multiple calls to Denise's house and workplace, including the calls made after they killed Davidson and driving away from the crime scene.

On September 17, 1995, the jury found Denise guilty of the first-degree murder of Davidson. Like in the trial of the two hitmen, the prosecution similarly sought the death penalty for Denise.

On September 25, 1995, the jury reached a split vote and recommended a life sentence for Denise, thus sparing her the death sentence. On that same day, Circuit Judge John Lenderman formally sentenced Denise to life imprisonment with the possibility of parole after 25 years. As Denise was 35 at the point, she would not be eligible for parole until she turned 60.

As of 2026, Denise Davidson remains incarcerated at the Homestead Correctional Institution.

== Appeals ==
On November 7, 1997, the Florida Supreme Court dismissed the appeal of Denise Davidson against her murder conviction.

On November 26, 1997, Robert Gordon's appeal against his death sentence and murder conviction was denied by the Florida Supreme Court.

On July 1, 1999, the Florida Supreme Court rejected Meryl McDonald's appeal against his conviction and sentence.

On December 18, 2003, Gordon's post-conviction appeal was turned down by the Florida Supreme Court.

On November 2, 2006, the Florida Supreme Court dismissed McDonald's petition for writ of habeas corpus.

On March 1, 2007, the 11th Circuit Court of Appeals rejected Gordon's petition for habeas relief.

On February 27, 2012, McDonald's petition for a writ of certiorari was denied by the United States Supreme Court.

On June 23, 2017, McDonald lost his appeal to the Florida Supreme Court.

On January 31, 2018, Gordon's re-sentencing petition was rejected by the Florida Supreme Court. The court ruled that Gordon was ineligible to be re-sentenced under a new death penalty law because his conviction and sentence was finalized prior to June 2002, the date of the landmark case Ring v. Arizona, and this new law decreed that juries could only impose death sentences based on unanimous votes. This law was only in effect for another five years before it was again reformed in 2023 to allow a person to be sentenced to death when at least eight jurors voted for a death sentence.

On June 4, 2020, McDonald's fourth post-conviction appeal was denied by the Florida Supreme Court.

== Death row ==
By January 2019, both Meryl McDonald and Robert Gordon were listed among the 103 Central Florida inmates detained on the state's death row.

A May 2019 article by the Tampa Bay Times revealed that McDonald and Gordon were among the 19 death row inmates awaiting execution for Pinellas County murder cases.

As of 2026, both Robert Gordon and Meryl McDonald remains on death row at the Union Correctional Institution.

== Aftermath ==
A decade after the murder of Louis Davidson, the seventh season of Forensic Files re-enacted the crime and first aired it on June 28, 2003, as the 38th episode.

In September 2021, true crime documentary Snapped re-adapted the murder of Davidson and aired the re-enactment episode on the streaming service Oxygen.

== See also ==
- Capital punishment in Florida
- List of death row inmates in the United States § Florida
