= Walter Scott (singer) =

American singer (1943–1983)

- Born: Walter Simon Notheis Jr. February 7, 1943; St. Louis, Missouri
- Died: December 27, 1983 (aged 40) St. Peters, Missouri
- Occupations: Singer
- Years active: 1966–1983
- Formerly of: Bob Kuban and The In-Men

Walter Simon Notheis, Jr. (February 7, 1943 – December 27, 1983), best remembered by his stage name of Walter Scott, was an American singer who fronted Bob Kuban and The In-Men, a St. Louis, Missouri-based rock 'n' roll band that had brief national popularity in the mid-1960s with the song "The Cheater".

== Career ==
Scott was born Walter Simon Notheis Jr. on February 7, 1943, in St. Louis, Missouri, to Catherine Marie (née Johnson; July 22, 1923 – June 27, 2022) and Walter Simon Notheis Sr. (May 31, 1921 – January 5, 2003).

Scott found fame with Bob Kuban and The In-Men in 1966 with his lead vocals on the song "The Cheater", spent eleven weeks on the Billboard Hot 100, peaking at #12 on March 12–19, 1966. The In-Men were never able to chart another Top 40 hit and Scott left the group soon after to attempt a solo career. When this failed, Scott began touring with a cover band during the 1970s.

In early 1983, Scott and Kuban performed together again for a television appearance, and planned to reunite the band for their twentieth anniversary in June 1983.

== Death ==
Scott disappeared on December 27, 1983. In April 1987, his body was found floating face-down in a cistern. He had been hog-tied and shot in the chest.

Scott's second wife, JoAnn (née Calcaterra), pleaded guilty to hindering the prosecution of his murder, and received a five-year sentence. She served 18 months of her sentence as a result of a plea bargain. Her lover, James H. Williams Sr., whom she had married in 1986, was found guilty of two counts of capital murder for the deaths of Scott, and of Williams' previous wife, Sharon Williams, who died on October 19, 1983 from what was originally thought to have been an automobile accident.

Police were told where to look for Scott's body by Williams' son.

The case was documented on the TLC TV series Forensic Files (season 7, episode 1: "The Cheater"), HBO's Autopsy 3: Voices From the Grave, Secrets of the Morgue (episode: "The Wells Run Dry"), Oxygen's Exhumed: Killer Revealed (episode: "Murders on the Edge of Town"), and as part of The New Detectives: Case Studies in Forensic Science (episode: "Grave Discoveries").

On September 11, 2011, James Williams Sr. died at age 72 while serving his life sentence. He had been in hospice in the state prison in Potosi, Missouri for some time due to having heart problems. JoAnn Williams died at age 75 in May 2019.
