= Blowfly's Party =

Studio album by Blowfly
- Released: 1980
- Genres: Parody, funk
- Label: Weird World Records
- Producer: Blowfly

Blowfly chronology
Zodiac Party (1978)	Blowfly's Party (1980)	Rappin', Dancin' and Laughin' (1981)

Professional ratings
Review scores
Source	Rating
AllMusic	4/5 stars

Blowfly's Party is the 1980 album by Clarence Reid as his alter ego Blowfly. It was released on the Weird World Records label, a subsidiary of T.K. Records. This album featured a reworked version of the classic "Rap Dirty" and also managed to chart in the US pop albums chart at No. 82 and on the Black Albums chart at No. 26.

The album was originally released under the name Blowfly's Disco Party but was reissued under the alternate title to avoid confusion with the 1977 album Disco.

== Track listing ==
All tracks are written by Clarence Reid.

No.	Title	Parody	Length
1.	"Blowfly's Rap (Instrumental)"		8:39
2.	"Panty Lines"		4:16
3.	"Prick Ryder"		3:27
4.	"Nobody’s Butt But Yours, Babe"	Nobody But You Babe by Clarence Reid	3:47
5.	"Blowfly's Rapp"		6:46
6.	"Show Me a Man Who Don't Like to Fuck"		3:37
7.	"Who Did I Eat Last Night?"		4:11
8.	"Can I Come In Your Mouth"		4:13

== Personnel ==
- Blowfly – Vocals, producer
- Benny Latimore – Keyboards
- George "Chocolate" Perry – Bass
- Jerome Smith – Guitar
- Little Beaver – Guitar
- Mike Lewis Orchestra – Strings, horns
- Rich Finch – Bass
- Robert Ferguson – Drums
- Timmy Thomas – Keyboards
- Wildfire – Backing vocals
