= The Weird World of Blowfly (album) =

The Weird World of Blow Fly

Studio album by Blow Fly
- Released: 1973
- Genre: Parody
- Length: 35:21
- Label: Weird World Records
- Producer: Blow Fly

Blow Fly chronology
The Weird World of Blow Fly (1973)	Blow Fly On T.V. (1974)

The Weird World of Blow Fly is the debut album by Clarence Reid as his alter ego Blowfly. It was released in 1973 on the Weird World Records label, a subsidiary of T.K. Records. The album features sexually explicit spoofs of soul and R&B hits, mostly from the 1960s and 1970s.

== Reception ==
Professional ratings
Review scores
Source	Rating
AllMusic	4/5 stars

AllMusic awarded the album 4 stars with its review by Stewart Mason stating, "Some will undoubtedly find the whole enterprise juvenile and distasteful, and frankly, a couple of the parodies are a little too obvious to be clever..., but most of the album is really very funny, for those who like this sort of thing".

== Track listing ==
All tracks are written by Clarence Reid.

No.	Title	Parody	Length
1.	"Intro"		1:05
2.	"My Baby Keeps Farting In My Face"	"Raindrops Keep Fallin' On My Head" by BJ Thomas	1:31
3.	"Hold On It's Running"	"Hold On, I'm Comin'" by Sam & Dave	1:24
4.	"Hole Man"	"Soul Man" by Sam & Dave	3:00
5.	"The Eating Song (Yum-Yum)"	"The Happy Song (Dum-Dum)" by Otis Redding	2:04
6.	"Shitting On The Dock of the Bay"	"(Sittin' On) The Dock of the Bay" by Otis Redding	2:34
7.	"To-To-To-To-To (The Fart Song)"	"Um, Um, Um, Um, Um, Um" by Major Lance	3:54
8.	"I Don't Want No Woman to Give Me Nothing"	"I Don't Want Nobody to Give Me Nothing" by James Brown	1:39
9.	"The Eater"	"The Cheater" by Bob Kuban and the In-Men	3:19
10.	"Spermy Night in Georgia"	"Rainy Night in Georgia" by Tony Joe White	2:20
11.	"Odd Balls"		2:28
12.	"Baby Let Me Do it To You"	"Can I Change My Mind" by Tyrone Davis	1:50
13.	"It's a Faggot's World"	"It's a Man's, Man's, Man's World" by James Brown	2:19
14.	"A Child's Dick"	"With a Child's Heart" by Stevie Wonder	2:10
15.	"The Sperm Is Gone"	"The Thrill Is Gone" by Roy Hawkins	2:42
16.	"Outro"		1:09

== Personnel ==
- Blowfly - Vocals, producer
- Benny Latimore - Keyboards
- George "Chocolate" Perry - Bass
- Jerome Smith - Guitar
- Little Beaver - Guitar
- Mike Lewis Orchestra - Strings, horns
- Rich Finch - Bass
- Robert Ferguson - Drums
- Timmy Thomas - Keyboards
- Wildfire - Backing vocals
- Freddy Stonewall - Engineer
