= The Weird World of Blowfly (film) =

- Directed by: Jonathan Furmanski
- Starring: Blowfly, Ice-T, Chuck D
- Release date: March 13, 2010 (SXSW)
- Running time: 89 minutes

The Weird World of Blowfly is a 2010 documentary film about rapper and hip hop musician Clarence Reid, a/k/a Blowfly, directed by Jonathan Furmanski. In addition to Reid, the film features collaborators Tom Bowker and Otto von Schirach along with perspectives from Chuck D, Ice-T, and Die Ärzte.
