= Richard Alexander (exonerated convict) =

Indiana man wrongfully convicted of rape

Richard Alexander (born December 1966) is an Indiana man who was wrongfully convicted of a 1996 rape and exonerated in 2001 by DNA evidence. Years later, on September 17, 2020, Alexander was charged with the murder of Catherine Minix, who was found stabbed to death. Minix had previously filed a protective order against Alexander for domestic violence.

== Arrest and conviction ==
In 1996, a suspected serial rapist dubbed by local media the "River Park Rapist" preyed on female residents of South Bend, Indiana. Police arrested Richard Alexander (then 30 years old) in August 1996 for four of the rapes, largely on the basis of the statements of the victims.

DNA evidence definitively excluded him as a suspect in one of the rapes, although both the victim and her fiancé continued to insist that Alexander was the perpetrator. Not all of the investigators were convinced of his guilt, particularly as three similar rapes occurred while Alexander was in police custody. In the case of one of the rapes that took place while he was in custody, Alexander's picture was accidentally placed in a photo-lineup shown to the victim. She selected his photograph as that of her assailant, despite his incarceration at the time of the offense.

Nevertheless, Alexander was prosecuted for the three rapes, with charges totaling two counts of robbery, two counts of criminal deviate conduct, two counts of attempted rape, confinement, attempted robbery, rape, burglary and auto theft. His 1997 trial ended in a hung jury, with eleven jurors voting for conviction; nine in favor of conviction for the charges brought and two for conviction of lesser charges. He was re-tried for the crimes in 1998. At the second trial, one of the victims, though identifying Alexander as her assailant, asserted that he had a hairless chest without tattoos. When it was demonstrated that Alexander had a hairy, heavily tattooed chest, he was acquitted of that rape. Nevertheless, he was convicted of the other two and was sentenced to 70 years in prison.

== Exoneration ==
In 2001, with Alexander already having served five years in prison, an alleged burglar and child molester named Michael Murphy confessed to one of the two rapes of which Alexander had been convicted, knowing details only the true assailant would know. With this revelation, a judge ordered a new round of DNA testing in Alexander's case. Hairs found at the scene of the rape were submitted to mitochondrial DNA testing. At the time of Alexander's original conviction, such testing was not available in the state of Indiana. The tests proved that the DNA did not match Alexander's profile, but did match Murphy's.

Because of this new development, Indiana prosecutors came to believe that Alexander was in fact not responsible for any of the rapes. In the remaining rape for which he was incarcerated, the evidence against him consisted of the victim's tentative identification of his voice and an eyewitness's visual identification of Alexander. The Indiana prosecutor and Alexander's defense attorney filed a joint motion to have Alexander's convictions overturned.

The courts granted the motion, and Alexander was exonerated of all charges and released from prison on December 12, 2001. It is now believed that the River Park Rapist was actually two separate perpetrators.

== Lawsuit ==
On June 4, 2002, Richard Alexander filed a federal suit against the city of South Bend, its police department and 14 of its officers, including Sgt. Cindy Eastman, an officer instrumental in securing Alexander's release. His lawyer, Roseann P. Ivanovich, said she expected to ask for about $55 million in damages ($10 million for every year spent in prison). Among the allegations in the 48-page lawsuit:

- Police showed photos of Alexander to rape victims who said they had not seen enough of their attackers' faces for a positive identification.
- Police coerced or constructed the identifications of Alexander that were used at his trial.
- Police destroyed evidence and ignored Alexander's alibis.

The civil rights lawsuit was eventually dismissed by the United States district court, a decision which Alexander appealed. But on January 3, 2006, the Court of Appeals for the Seventh Circuit upheld the district court's dismissal of Alexander's lawsuit. The court stated that Alexander had not proven his rights were violated during the trial which yielded his wrongful conviction.

== Subsequent legal troubles ==
On May 22, 2007, Alexander pleaded guilty to one count of battery for having beaten a former girlfriend with a lead pipe in 2005. As part of his plea bargain, a second count of battery was dismissed.

On June 14, 2007, Alexander was sentenced to eight years in prison, with two years suspended.

On September 17, 2020, he was charged in the stabbing death of his ex-girlfriend following a pattern of domestic violence. Midway through his trial Alexander took a plea deal for a lesser charge of voluntary manslaughter. He was subsequently sentenced to 50 years in prison.

== Trivia ==
- Alexander's case was made into an August 2002 episode, "Within a Hair", of the series Forensic Files.
- In February 2002, Alexander's name was invoked by Senator Patrick Leahy (D-Vermont) in a floor statement in support of the Innocence Protection Act.

== See also ==
- List of wrongful convictions in the United States
