= Richard L. Alexander =

American boxer

Richard Lear Alexander
- Born: July 22, 1914; Grant Park, Illinois, U.S.
- Died: April 19, 1993 (aged 78)
- Military career
- Allegiance: United States
- Branch: Royal Canadian Air Force (1940–42); United States Army Air Forces (1942–47); United States Air Force (1947–48)
- Service years: 1940–1948
- Rank: Captain
- Nickname: Dixie
- Conflicts: World War II
- Awards: Silver Star; Distinguished Flying Cross; Purple Heart; Air Medal (13)

Richard Lear Alexander (July 22, 1914 – April 19, 1993) was an American World War II fighter ace who fought for the Allies in both the Royal Canadian Air Force and the United States Army Air Forces.

== Early life ==
Alexander was born in Grant Park, Illinois on July 22, 1914. He played as an outfielder for the Cincinnati Reds' minor league farm team for eight years and was also a professional middleweight boxer.

== Military service ==
=== World War II ===
Alexander attempted to join the United States Army Air Corps but was rejected because he had only received a high school education and at least some college education was required for USAAF service. He joined the Royal Canadian Air Force in October 1940 to get involved in the war as a pilot as well as to avoid being drafted and sent to serve in the infantry. At the time, he had only 25 hours of flying experience, far below the normal requirements for the Royal Air Force (RAF). He earned his wings by 15 September 1941 and was assigned to the 133 Eagle Squadron in England. Nearly a year later, in August 1942, Alexander participated in Operation Jubilee, which he later called his "most memorable day in the RAF". In two missions as a part of this operation he shot down two German aircraft and damaged a third.

In September 1942, Alexander transferred to the United States Army Air Forces 4th Fighter Group. He joined the 109th Observation Squadron in January 1943 as deputy flight commander. Based near Shrewsbury, England, this squadron was created as the first operation training unit for American pilots. Given their experience after years of flying for the RAF and the relative inexperience of American recruits, instructors like Alexander often found themselves training pilots of higher rank than they were. Around this time was also the introduction of the P-47D Thunderbolt ("Jug") to US air forces. Alexander became one of the first American pilots to fly the "Jug" on 10 April 1943. He remained in Europe until April 1943, at which point he joined the 52nd Fighter Group's 2nd Fighter Squadron in North Africa.

On 30 May 1944, Alexander was shot down over Austria and taken as a prisoner of war by the Germans after evading capture for five days. He was held at Stalag Luft III in Bavaria until it was liberated in May 1945.

In the course of his service in World War II, Alexander was credited with five confirmed kills and one probable kill, qualifying him to be labeled an ace.

=== Cold War ===
Alexander served with the 33rd Fighter Group's 60th Fighter Squadron in Germany until an accident cost him his right arm in January 1947. Following the accident, he was medically retired from the Air Force on 7 February 1948.

== Honours ==
Alexander was a recipient of a Silver Star, a Distinguished Flying Cross, a Purple Heart, and the Air Medal with 12 oak leaf clusters, among other medals.
