= Blowfly (musician) =

American musician (1939–2016)

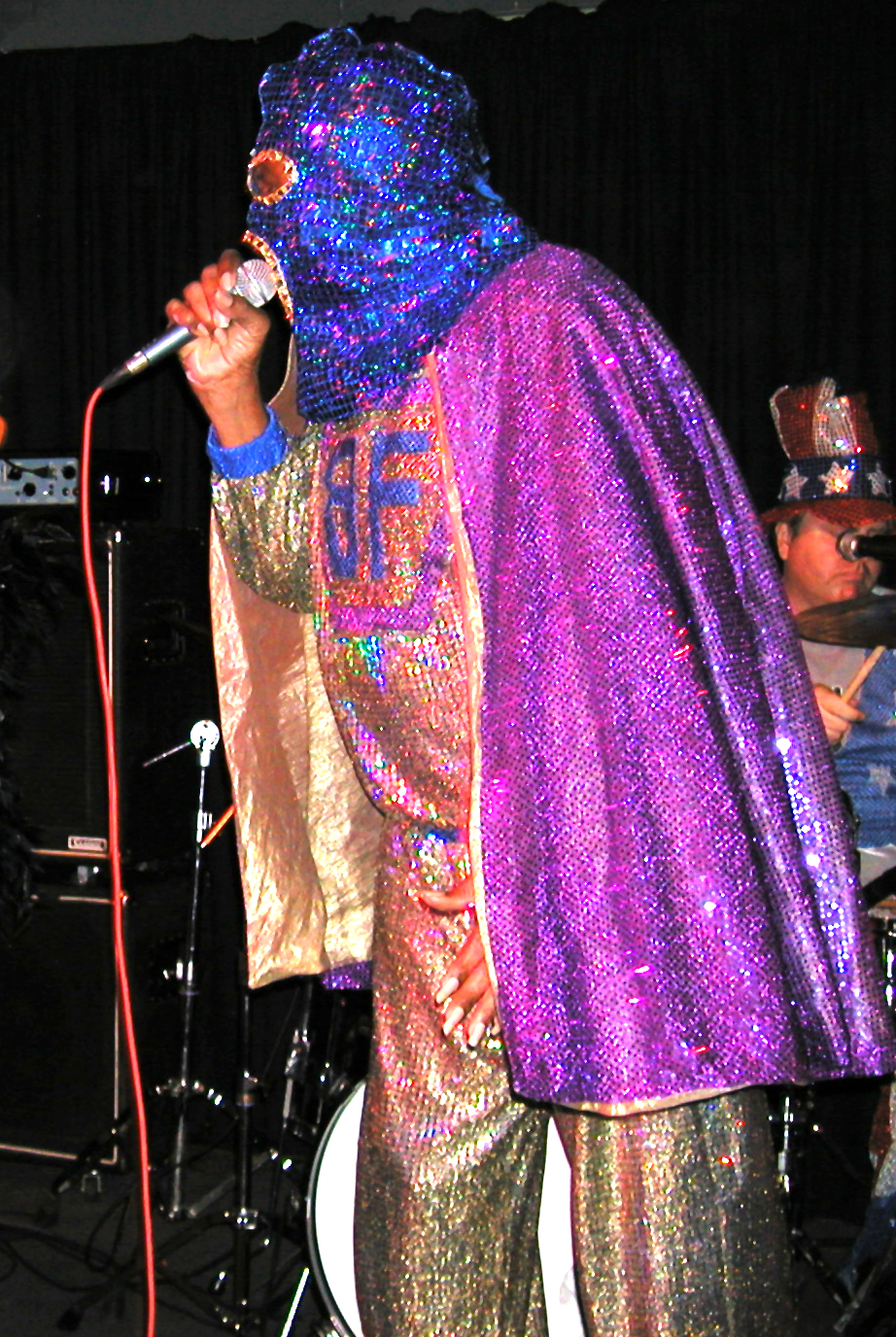
- On stage at Bottom of the Hill, circa 2005

Background information
- Also known as: Clarence Reid
- Born: Clarence Henry Reid; February 14, 1939; Cochran, Georgia, U.S.
- Died: January 17, 2016 (aged 76) Lauderdale Lakes, Florida, U.S.
- Genres: Parody; comedy; R&B; soul; funk; hip hop; punk rock
- Occupations: Rapper; singer; songwriter; record producer
- Years active: 1960–2016
- Labels: TK Records; Alternative Tentacles
- Formerly of: Willie Clarke

Clarence Henry Reid (February 14, 1939 – January 17, 2016) was an American musician, songwriter and producer also known by the stage name and alternate persona Blowfly. He released over 25 parody albums as Blowfly and another three albums as Clarence Reid.

== Biography ==
Reid was born in Cochran, Georgia, in 1939 and moved to West Palm Beach, Florida, in his adolescence (c. 1949). His stage name was given to him by his grandmother who he would visit in Georgia occasionally. During this time, Reid would make explicit parodies of the country music that was popular on the airwaves in Cochran then, prompting his grandmother to brand him a "blowfly".

In hillbilly, you'll find some of the best lyrics and morals. I used to listen to Homer and Jethro, and they would rap most of the time, only they didn't call it rap then. They used to call it soul talkin'. As a form of revenge, I would take songs like "The Twist," and I would change it from (sings) "Come on baby, let's do the twist" to "Come on baby, and suck my d-!" My grandma would say that's terrible, you're a poor excuse for a human being. Child, you're nastier than a blowfly.

During the 1960s and 1970s he wrote for and produced artists including Betty Wright, Sam & Dave, Gwen McCrae, Jimmy "Bo" Horne, Bobby Byrd, and KC & the Sunshine Band. Reid wrote hit songs such as Betty Wright's Clean Up Woman and Gwen McCrae's Rockin' Chair. During this period he was also a recording artist, cutting many of his own songs, including "Nobody But You Babe" and his first XXX record, "Oddballs" which was reworked into "Rapp Dirty" several years later.

Reid wrote sexually explicit versions of hit songs for fun but only performed them for his friends at parties or in the studio. In 1971, he along with a band of studio musicians, recorded a whole album of these songs under the name Blowfly. The album, The Weird World of Blowfly, features Reid dressed as a low-rent supervillain on its cover. Blowfly continued to perform in bizarre costumes as his Blowfly character and record sexually explicit albums throughout the 1970s and 1980s. Reid claimed to be one of the first artists to perform in a mask, and transitioned from a "tuxedo like Dracula" or a "buttless" Clint Eastwood inspired outfit, to the spandex suits that he became known for in response to public demand. The albums were widely popular as "party records". He recorded the explicit version of his song "Rapp Dirty" (a.k.a. "Blowfly's Rapp") in 1980. Blowfly's music has been described as a precursor to hip-hop.

This veteran writer-producer has his soul in the right place—Miami, as far south as he can get it. And though he's a/k/a Blow Fly, purveyor of parody porn, the true Reid is as unyielding a moralist as Porter Wagoner or Ernest Tubb. He cheats a lot, just like his daddy, but he also pays—in one song, his 'real woman' goes off to find 'a real man,' while in another she simply kills herself and is he sorry. The only drawback is that Reid is a writer-producer for a reason—vocals.

— Review of Running Water in Christgau's Record Guide: Rock Albums of the Seventies (1981)

Blowfly's profane style earned Reid legal trouble. He was sued by songwriter Stanley Adams, who was ASCAP president at the time, for spoofing "What a Diff'rence a Day Makes" as "What a Difference a Lay Makes". Reid's own compositions have been sampled by dozens of hip hop, R&B, and electronic artists but Reid received almost no money from sampling due to signing away most of his royalties.

Blowfly's Zodiac Blowfly LP (also released on CD in 1996 on Weird World Records) includes the songs "If Eating You Is Wrong, I Don't Want To Be Right", "The First Time Ever You Sucked My Dick", and "Ain't No Head Like My Woman's Head", as well as a version of "Clean Up Woman", which he co-wrote. Another album of this period is The Weird World of Blowfly.

=== 2000s ===
In 2003, Blowfly sold the rights to his entire catalog after years of debt. After 17 years of sporadic touring and occasional re-recording of his classic raps, Blowfly signed with Jello Biafra's independent record label Alternative Tentacles in 2005. Fahrenheit 69, the first album under the new contract, featured appearances from Slug of Atmosphere, King Coleman, Gravy Train, and Afroman.

Blowfly's Punk Rock Party, a 2006 album release from Alternative Tentacles, features several punk rock classics given the Blowfly treatment—including a rewrite of the Dead Kennedys song "Holiday in Cambodia" recast as "R. Kelly in Cambodia", which features Biafra (the song's composer and original singer) playing a trial judge. The album also includes "I Wanna Be Fellated", "Gotta Keep Her Penetrated", "I Wanna Fuck Your Dog" and "Should I Fuck This Big Fat Ho?". Blowfly completed his first tour of Australia in March 2007, and toured Germany with Die Ärzte in 2008. He performed at the 2010 Big Day Out music festival, held in Australia and New Zealand.

The movie The Weird World of Blowfly was directed by Jonathan Furmanski and premiered at South by Southwest in 2010; it received a wider release in September 2011.

=== Illness and death ===
On January 12, 2016, Blowfly drummer "Uncle" Tom Bowker announced in a statement on the Blowfly Facebook page that Reid was suffering from terminal liver cancer and had been admitted to a hospice facility in Florida. According to Bowker, the singer would release his final LP – entitled 77 Rusty Trombones – in February 2016. Reid died on January 17, 2016, from cancer and multiple organ failure at the hospice facility in Lauderdale Lakes, Florida, aged 76.

== Family ==
Reid's daughter is former WNBA player Tracy Reid.

== Discography ==
=== Albums as Clarence Reid ===
- Dancin' with Nobody But You Babe (1969)
- Running Water (1973)
- On the Job (1976)

=== Albums as Blowfly ===
- The Weird World of Blowfly (1971 or 1973)
- Blow Fly on TV (1974)
- Zodiac Blowfly (1975)
- Oldies But Goodies (1976)
- Blowfly's Disco Party (1977)
- At the Movies (1977)
- Zodiac Party (1978)
- Blowfly's Party (1980) #82 US, #26 Black Albums
- Rappin' Dancing & Laughin (1980)
- Butterfly (1981)
- Porno Freak (1981)
- Fresh Juice (1983)
- Electronic Banana (1985)
- On Tour 1986 (1986)
- Blowfly and the Temple of Doom (1987)
- Blowfly for President (1988)
- Freak Party (1989)
- Twisted World of Blowfly (1991)
- 2001: A Sex Odyssey (1996)
- Analthology: The Best of Blowfly (1996)
- Blowfly Does XXX-Mas (1999)
- Fahrenheit 69 (2005)
- Blowfly's Punk Rock Party (2006)
- Superblowfly (2007)
- Live At the Platypussery (2008)
- Black in the Sack (2012) – PATAC records
- 77 Rusty Trombones (2016)
