= Bob Kuban =

American musician and bandleader (1940–2025)

- Birth name: Robert Kuban
- Born: August 19, 1940; St. Louis, Missouri, U.S.
- Died: January 20, 2025 (aged 84)
- Genres: R&B; soul; pop
- Occupations: Musician; bandleader
- Instrument: Drummer
- Years active: 1963–2025
- Labels: Sony BMG Music Entertainment, Classic Music Int'l

Robert Kuban (August 19, 1940 – January 20, 2025) was an American musician and bandleader.

== Life and career ==
Kuban was born in St. Louis, Missouri on August 19, 1940. He graduated from the St. Louis Institute of Music. In the early 1960s, Kuban was a music teacher and band director at Bishop DuBourg High School, a Catholic secondary school in St. Louis.

In 1964, he formed the group Bob Kuban and The In-Men. Kuban was both its drummer and the bandleader. The group was an eight-piece band with horns. Kuban was heavily influenced by Ike & Tina Turner, whom he would watch perform at Club Imperial in St. Louis before his band became regulars. He said, "I just loved the band so much... I mimicked a lot of the stuff that they did. We had the horn section in my band. When Ike and Tina Turner left, we were able to play there. We were there on Tuesday nights."

He is best known for his 1966 No. 12 pop hit, "The Cheater". For this hit single Kuban is honored in the Rock and Roll Hall of Fame's permanent exhibit on one-hit wonders. After "The Cheater," Kuban never again scored high on the pop charts, although he did have two other top 100 hits: "The Teaser" peaked at No. 70; and a remake of the Lennon–McCartney song "Drive My Car" went to No. 93. In Canada the second single, "The Teaser", reached number 65. Kuban continued to be a fixture on the St. Louis music scene, and still toured and performed at private parties. Bob Kuban and The In-Men performed for the opening ceremonies of Busch Memorial Stadium in St. Louis on May 12, 1966; and The Bob Kuban Brass performed before the last regular-season baseball game there on October 2, 2005.

In the 1960s, a spin-off of the group was a band called The Guise, led by In-Men organist and songwriter Greg Hoeltzel. The Guise performed in the 1969 St. Louis premiere of a composition by classical composer Arthur Custer and jazz composer Julius Hemphill titled "Songs of Freedom, Love, and War."

Kuban died from a stroke on January 20, 2025, at the age of 84.

== Charted singles ==
- "The Cheater" – 1965 (US #12)
- "The Teaser" – 1966 (US #70)
- "Drive My Car" – 1966 (US #93)
