= List of wrongful convictions in the United States =

This list of wrongful convictions in the United States includes people who have been legally exonerated, including people whose convictions have been overturned or vacated, and who have not been retried because the charges were dismissed by the states. It also includes some historic cases of people who have not been formally exonerated (by a formal process such as has existed in the United States since the mid-20th century) but who historians believe are factually innocent. Generally, this means that research by historians has revealed original conditions of bias or extrajudicial actions that related to their convictions and/or executions.

Crime descriptions marked with an asterisk (*) indicate that the events were later determined not to be criminal acts. People who were wrongfully accused are sometimes never released.

By June 2025, a total of 3,696 exonerations were mentioned in the National Registry of Exonerations. The total time these exonerated people spent in prison adds up to 34,072 years. Detailed data from 1989 regarding every known exoneration in the United States is listed. Data prior to 1989, however, is limited.

== Before 1900 ==
| Date of crime | Defendants | Crime | Location | Sentence | Time served | Legally exonerated |
|---|---|---|---|---|---|---|
| 1736 | Andrew | Rape* | Caroline County, Virginia | Death by hanging | Executed | No |
| 1736 | Andrew | In 1736, Andrew, a slave belonging to Richard Bradford, and a married white indentured servant named Elizabeth Williams were convicted of adultery for having consensual sex in Caroline County. Unsatisfied with the verdict, some successfully lobbied for Andrew to be prosecuted for rape. Andrew was convicted of rape, sentenced to death, and executed on June 4, 1736. The incident was later seen as a miscarriage of justice since it was undisputed that the two had engaged in consensual sex. After this, the county stopped punishing black men when white women gave birth to mixed race children. However, four white women would later be flogged in such cases. | | | | |
| November 12, 1805 | Dominic Daley and James Halligan | Murder | Wilbraham, Massachusetts | Death by hanging | Executed | No |
| November 12, 1805 | Dominic Daley and James Halligan | In November 1805, the body of a young farmer, Marcus Lyon, was found on the open road near the town of Wilbraham, Massachusetts. Irish immigrants Dominic Daley and James Halligan were traveling in the area, heading for New Haven, Connecticut, when they were arrested for the murder on November 12, 1805. Their captor received a reward of $500. They had a lengthy confinement, and were not granted defense attorneys until 48 hours before their trial. They were convicted within an hour. One of the defense attorneys said that the evidence was so flimsy it was obvious their conviction was based on outright bigotry. They were executed the next day. On St. Patrick's Day 1984, Governor Michael Dukakis of Massachusetts issued a proclamation exonerating Daley and Halligan. Author John S. Bowman has said that while Daley and Halligan may have been innocent, the role of anti-Catholic and anti-Irish bias has been heavily exaggerated. The religion of the two defendants was never mentioned at the trial and the prosecution only made one overt reference to the defendants being Irish. | | | | |
| 1812 | Jesse Boorn and Stephen Boorn | Murder* | Manchester, Vermont | Death (commuted to life imprisonment; Stephen) | Less than 1 year | Yes |
| 1812 | Jesse Boorn and Stephen Boorn | In 1812, farmer Russell Colvin disappeared from Manchester, Vermont. Colvin and his brothers-in-law, Jesse and Stephen Boorn, had a tense relationship. Many suspected the Boorn brothers of murdering Colvin, but no evidence emerged until 1819. That year, their uncle Amos claimed Colvin's ghost had appeared to him and stated he had been murdered. The ghost also told him he was buried on the Boorn farm. An excavation revealed bones, and the brothers were arrested. A jailhouse informant claimed Jesse had admitted to the crime, which Jesse later did to investigators. The brothers were convicted based on their confessions. In November, however, the New York Post published a letter by an eyewitness who claimed to have seen Colvin alive earlier that year. Colvin, now living in New Jersey, was brought back to Vermont. The court vacated the Boorns' convictions. | | | | |
| June 23, 1855 | Celia | Murder* | Missouri | Death by hanging | Executed | Yes |
| June 23, 1855 | Celia | Celia was a slave who was executed in Missouri in 1855 for the murder of her master, whom she killed in self-defense after he tried to rape her. Celia's master had been raping her on a regular basis for years. The judge denied the defense's jury instruction to acquit based on the sexual assault and denied the jury any ability to acquit on grounds for self-defense or to find Celia justified to ward off her master's sexual advances with force or at all. He also prevented the defense from arguing that Celia had killed her master by accident. Governor Mike Parson posthumously pardoned Celia on December 20, 2024. | | | | |
| October 31, 1855 | Chief Leschi | Murder* | Olympia, Washington Territory | Death by hanging | Executed | No |
| October 31, 1855 | Chief Leschi | Leschi was a Nisqually chief when the United States government attempted to relocate the tribe to reservations. Leschi protested the move, claiming the reservation designated for the Nisqually was a rocky piece of high ground unsuited to growing food and cut off from access to the river that provided salmon, the mainstay of their livelihood. Leschi traveled to the territorial capital at Olympia to protest the terms of the treaty. He became war chief, in command of around 300 men, and led a small number of raids. Early in the conflict, Territorial militiamen Abram Benton Moses and Joseph Miles (or Miller) were killed. Leschi did not deny killing the militiamen, but said it was not murder since they were combatants during wartime. Nevertheless, he was found guilty of and executed by hanging in 1858. In 2004, he was posthumously exonerated by a historical court of inquiry but this decision is not legally binding. | | | | |
| 1862 | Jack Kehoe | Murder | Schuylkill County, Pennsylvania | Death by hanging | Executed | Yes |
| 1862 | Jack Kehoe | Kehoe was one of the alleged leaders of the Molly Maguires, a secret society which fought against mine bosses and enacted its own brand of vigilante justice in the anthracite region of Pennsylvania. The Mollies were exposed after an infiltration by Pinkerton detective James McParland, whose testimony resulted in Kehoe's conviction on attempted murder charges in 1876; not satisfied with Kehoe's sentence, the authorities then tried Kehoe for the 1862 murder of mine foreman Frank Langdon, who was beaten to death after leaving a meeting during which Kehoe had reportedly threatened to kill him. Witnesses testified that Kehoe was not at the scene of the crime and no evidence connected him to the attack aside from his threat against Langdon and the well-known animosity between the two men. Kehoe was hanged on December 18, 1878. In 1970, Governor Milton Shapp issued a pardon posthumously clearing Kehoe. | | | | |
| 1863 | Chipita Rodriguez | Murder | San Patricio, Texas | Death by hanging | Executed | Yes |
| 1863 | Chipita Rodriguez | Rodriguez was convicted of murdering John Savage with an axe and executed. She was posthumously exonerated in 1985. | | | | |
| May 5, 1872 | William Jackson Marion | Murder* | Liberty, Nebraska | Death by hanging | Executed | Yes |
| May 5, 1872 | William Jackson Marion | Marion was convicted of killing John Cameron, who left with him to work on the railroad in 1872. In 1891, four years after Marion's execution by hanging, Cameron turned up alive, explaining that he had vanished by his own volition. He had spent twenty years traveling across Mexico, Alaska, and Colorado. On March 25, 1987, Marion was pardoned posthumously by the State of Nebraska on the 100th anniversary of his hanging. | | | | |
| September 12, 1880 | Thomas Egan | Murder | Minnehaha County, South Dakota | Death by hanging | Executed | Yes |
| September 12, 1880 | Thomas Egan | Thomas Egan convicted of murdering his wife, Mary Egan, and executed in 1882. In 1927, his stepdaughter, Catherine Egan, made a deathbed confession to the murder. She admitted to killing her stepmother and that she and her husband had then conspired to frame Egan. Thomas Egan was posthumously pardoned in 1993. | | | | |
| December 12, 1885 | James "Jimmy" Phillips | Murder | Austin, Texas | 7 years | 6 months | Yes |
| December 12, 1885 | James "Jimmy" Phillips | Phillips' wife Eula was murdered with an axe outside her home on 12 December 1885. He was accused of her murder based on allegations that he was abusive towards her and that she had been having an affair. Phillips was convicted in spite of his footprints not matching those left at the scene by Eula's killer, but he was released six months later after an appeals court found insufficient evidence to prove his guilt. It is now believed that Eula was a victim of the Servant Girl Annihilator. | | | | |
| May 4, 1886 | Oscar Neebe, Michael Schwab, and Samuel Fielden | Conspiracy to commit murder | Chicago, Illinois | 15 years | 7 years | Yes |
| May 4, 1886 | Oscar Neebe, Michael Schwab, and Samuel Fielden | Neebe was not present at the Haymarket Square on the day of the bombing, and stated that he was not aware it had happened until he was told about it the following day. He was arrested because of his association with the defendants. At trial, the evidence against Neebe was particularly weak, mostly based on his political views, his having attended socialist meetings, being associated with the newspaper, Arbeiter-Zeitung, and the fact that a shotgun, a pistol and red flag were found in his home. On June 26, 1893, Illinois Governor John Peter Altgeld pardoned Neebe and two of his co-defendants, having concluded that they were innocent. | | | | |
| October 12, 1888 | John D. Cochran | Murder* | Wabash County, Illinois | Life imprisonment | 16 months | Yes |
| October 12, 1888 | John D. Cochran | On October 16, 1888, John Buchenberger was found unconscious in a shed, shot once in the head. His revolver, with one empty cartridge chamber, was found nearby. He died from his injuries three days later. John Cochran was accused of his murder. The chief prosecution witness against him was a horse thief named Charles Reese, who claimed that Cochran had admitted to the murder. Cochran's attorney argued that Buchenberger had committed suicide and Reese was lying in hopes of leniency for himself. Nevertheless, Cochran was convicted of murder and sentenced to life in prison. Sixteen months later, Buchenberger's wife produced a suicide note from her husband. After reviewing the note, Governor Joseph W. Fifer pardoned Cochran on August 6, 1890. | | | | |
| 1893 | Will Purvis | Murder | Marion County, Mississippi | Death (commuted to life imprisonment) | Five years | Yes |
| 1893 | Will Purvis | Will Buckley, a member of a white supremacist militia known as the Whitecaps, was gunned down in an ambush over a dispute with his fellow Whitecaps. Bloodhounds led police from the crime scene to the home of Will Purvis, a known Whitecap who was identified by Buckley's brother as one of the gunmen. Purvis was sentenced to death in spite of witnesses who supported his alibi, but an attempt to hang him failed and his sentence was commuted in 1895. He was pardoned and released in 1898 when Buckley's brother recanted his testimony, and was later fully compensated after one of the real killers made a deathbed confession clearing him in 1917. | | | | |
| Aug 9, 1894 | George Washington Davis | Sabotage of Locomotive 213 | Lincoln, Nebraska | Life imprisonment | 10 years | Yes |
| Aug 9, 1894 | George Washington Davis | Davis was convicted of causing the 1894 Rock Island railroad wreck, which killed eleven of thirty-three people on a passenger train traveling from Fairbury, Nebraska, to Lincoln. Some survivors claimed to have seen him holding a lantern at the site of the crash; however, there was no evidence that Davis had anything to do with the incident. In 1905, Davis was paroled by Nebraska governor John Mickey, citing "grave doubts" as to his involvement in the crash. | | | | |
| 1895 | Nellie Pope | Murder | Detroit, Michigan | Life imprisonment | 22 years | Yes |
| 1895 | Nellie Pope | Dr. Horace Pope was killed in a burglary of his home in 1895. The killer, William Brusseau, claimed that Pope's wife Nellie had orchestrated the crime for a life insurance payment. Both Brusseau and Nellie Pope were given life sentences. Brusseau died while serving his sentence, and confessed on his deathbed that Nellie Pope was not involved in the crime and he had acted alone. This led to a prolonged campaign for her exoneration until Governor Woodbridge N. Ferris granted her a conditional pardon in 1916 and she was released; this pardon did not address her guilt or innocence, and she was not officially exonerated until Governor Fred W. Green granted her a full pardon in 1928 which declared her innocent. She died less than a year later. | | | | |
| 1896 | Jack Davis | Murder | Silver City, Idaho | Death by hanging | 6 years | Yes |
| 1896 | Jack Davis | Davis was convicted of the Deep Creek murders of Daniel Cummings and John Wilson. He was later pardoned following confessions by James Bower and Jeff Gray. | | | | |

== 1900s ==
| Date of crime | Defendant(s) | Crime | Location | Sentence | Time served | Legally exonerated |
|---|---|---|---|---|---|---|
| 1900 | Caleb Powers | Murder | Frankfort, Kentucky | Life imprisonment | 8 years | Yes |
| 1900 | Caleb Powers | Powers was convicted of complicity in the assassination of Governor William Goebel in 1900. The prosecution charged that Powers was the mastermind, having a political opponent killed so that his boss, Governor William S. Taylor, could stay in office. He was sentenced to prison. An appeals court overturned Powers' conviction, though Powers was tried three more times, resulting in two convictions and a hung jury. Governor Augustus E. Willson pardoned Powers in 1908. Powers had served eight years in prison. While in prison, Powers wrote a memoir, My Own Story (1905). | | | | |
| December 23, 1905 | Floyd Westfield | Murder* | Chattanooga, Tennessee | Death by hanging | 2 years | Yes |
| December 23, 1905 | Floyd Westfield | During a Christmas celebration in 1905, Westfield, a black man, shot and killed Alonzo Rains, a white constable. He admitted to killing Rains, but said he acted in self-defense. In 1906, Westfield was convicted of first degree murder and sentenced to death. He was granted a new trial by the Tennessee Supreme Court, which found that a lesser conviction would be more appropriate. Westfield's second trial ended in a hung jury, with one juror favoring a second degree murder conviction, one juror favoring a manslaughter conviction, and two jurors favoring an acquittal. The third trial resulted in Westfield again being convicted of first degree murder and having his death sentence reinstated. However, the Tennessee Supreme Court overturned his conviction, finding that the facts of the case did not warrant a first degree murder conviction. At his fourth trial, the prosecution chose to only try Westfield for manslaughter. On February 25, 1908, Westfield was acquitted and released from custody. It was determined that Constable Rains was abusive and had attacked Westfield, who had committed no crime, without any lawful justification. Constable Rains, who had been courting a local school teacher, became enraged by the noise being made from a nearby party at the home of Westfield's grandmother, where firecrackers and Roman candles were being set. Even as his own friends later tried to dissuade him, Rains attacked Westfield's grandmother's house, firing a shot through the door with his pistol. In response, Westfield shot and killed him. The death of Constable Rains contributed to the racist atmosphere that resulted in the lynching of Ed Johnson. | | | | |
| Feb 11, 1906 | Ed Johnson | Rape | Chattanooga, Tennessee | Death by hanging | Killed by lynch mob | Yes |
| Feb 11, 1906 | Ed Johnson | Ed Johnson, a black man, was convicted in Chattanooga, Tennessee of the rape of Nevada Taylor, a white woman, and sentenced to death. Taylor's initial description of her assailant was very vague. She told police she did not get a good look at him and only knew that the attacker was black. After the reward was increased to $375, another man in town told police he saw Johnson at the scene. Taylor subsequently identified Johnson as her rapist, but admitted under oath that she was not certain it was him. Johnson was beaten by sheriff Joseph Shipp to extract a confession, but maintained his innocence. On March 3, 1906, Johnson appealed the conviction, alleging that his constitutional rights had been violated. Specifically, he said that all blacks had been excluded from the jury considering his case, and that he should have been granted a change of venue, and a continuance. He was granted a stay of execution and an appeal to the U.S. Supreme Court. When Sheriff Shipp learned of the court's decision, he moved most prisoners to other floors of the jail and sent home all but one deputy. Johnson was pulled from his cell by a mob of white men and hanged at the Walnut Street Bridge. Following the lynching, Shipp publicly blamed the Supreme Court's interference with local courts for Johnson's death. The U.S. Supreme Court charged Shipp, his chief jailer, and several members of the lynch mob with contempt of court on the basis that Sheriff Shipp, with full knowledge of the court's ruling, willfully ignored his duties to protect a prisoner in his care and allowed Johnson to be lynched. United States v. Shipp is the only criminal trial of the Supreme Court in its entire history. It is considered an important decision in that it affirmed the right of the U.S. Supreme Court to intervene in state criminal cases. Shipp and five of his co-defendants were convicted of contempt of court and sentenced to terms from 2–3 months in federal prison. Johnson's conviction was overturned in 2000, 94 years after his death, after a court ruled that he had not received a fair trial. | | | | |

== 1910s ==
| Date of crime | Defendant(s) | Crime | Location | Sentence | Time served | Legally exonerated |
|---|---|---|---|---|---|---|
| Aug 23, 1912 | William Cantwell Walters | Kidnapping of Bobby Dunbar | St. Landry Parish, Louisiana | Life imprisonment | Two years | Yes |
| Aug 23, 1912 | William Cantwell Walters | 4-year-old Bobby Dunbar disappeared on a fishing trip with his parents on August 23, 1912. Eight months later, William Walters was arrested while travelling with a boy who resembled Dunbar. He told authorities that the boy was Bruce Anderson, the son of his employer who he was looking after, and Anderson's mother confirmed this. However, the Dunbars maintained the boy was their son. A court ultimately ruled in favor of the Dunbars and the boy found with Walters was given to them and lived as Bobby Dunbar until his death. Walters was convicted of kidnapping, but was released on appeal after two years. In 2004, DNA profiling revealed that the child, now deceased, was indeed Bruce Anderson, posthumously vindicating Walters. | | | | |
| 1912 | Bill Wilson | Murder* | Blount County, Alabama | Life imprisonment | 6 years | Yes |
| 1912 | Bill Wilson | Wilson was convicted of murdering his wife, Jenny Wilson, and their 19-month-old daughter. Bones presented by the prosecution in court were later discovered to be those of at least four or five people and likely of indigenous ethnicity. Wilson received a formal pardon from the Alabama governor after his wife and daughter were discovered to be living in Vincennes, Indiana. | | | | |
| Apr 24, 1913 | Thomas Griffin, Meeks Griffin, Nelson Brice, and John Crosby | Murder | Chester County, South Carolina | Death by electrocution | Executed | No |
| Apr 24, 1913 | Thomas Griffin, Meeks Griffin, Nelson Brice, and John Crosby | The Griffins were prominent black farmers in Chester County, South Carolina, believed to be the wealthiest blacks in the area. They were convicted and executed via the electric chair in 1915 for the murder in 1913 of 74-year-old John Q. Lewis. The Griffin brothers were convicted based on the accusations of another black man, John "Monk" Stevenson, who was known to be a small-time thief. Stevenson, who was found in possession of the victim's pistol, was sentenced to life in prison in exchange for testifying against the brothers. Two other African Americans, Nelson Brice and John Crosby, were executed with the brothers for the same crime. Some in the community believed that Lewis may have been murdered because of his suspected consensual sexual relationship with 22-year-old Anna Davis, a black married woman. Davis and her husband were never tried for the murder of Lewis, possibly for fear of a "mixed race relationship" scandal. Over 100 people petitioned Gov. Richard Manning to commute the brothers' sentence. The signatories included prominent white people, including Blackstock's mayor, a sheriff, two trial jurors, and the grand jury foreman. But the governor allowed the brothers to be executed. In October 2009, the governor of South Carolina pardoned Thomas and Meeks Griffin. Their great-nephew Tom Joyner had achieved the pardons after investigating the case and presenting evidence to the state of the injustice, after learning about his relatives' executions. | | | | |
| Apr 26, 1913 | Leo Frank | Murder | Marietta, Georgia | Death (commuted to life imprisonment) | Killed by lynch mob | No |
| Apr 26, 1913 | Leo Frank | Frank, a Jewish man, was a factory superintendent who was convicted in 1913 of the murder of 13-year-old Mary Phagan, a Protestant employee. Originally sentenced to death, Georgia's outgoing governor commuted Frank's sentence to life in prison. Frank was subsequently abducted from prison and lynched. In 1986, the Georgia State Board of Pardons and Paroles issued a pardon in recognition of the state's failure to protect Frank from being lynched and the state's failure to prosecute the lynchers. The pardon explicitly declined to address Frank's guilt or innocence, but the consensus of historians is that he was innocent. | | | | |
| Jan 10, 1914 | Joe Hill | Murder | Salt Lake City, Utah | Death by firing squad | Executed | No |
| Jan 10, 1914 | Joe Hill | Joe Hill was convicted for the murder of John Morrison, a grocer, and his son. On the evening that the murder occurred, Hill appeared on the doorstep of a local doctor with a bullet wound through his left lung. Moreover, the killer was reported to have worn a red bandana, something which Hill also owned. However, the majority consensus among historians is that Hill was sentenced primarily for political reasons, as he was an outspoken member of the IWW, a revolutionary labor union, and that he was innocent. | | | | |
| Jul 22, 1916 | Thomas Mooney | Preparedness Day Bombing | San Francisco, California | Death (commuted to life imprisonment) | 22 years | Yes |
| Jul 22, 1916 | Thomas Mooney | After being convicted and imprisoned for a 1916 bombing in San Francisco, Mooney appealed his case. He filed a writ of habeas corpus that was heard by the United States Supreme Court in 1937. Although he presented evidence that his conviction was obtained through the use of perjured testimony and that the prosecution had suppressed favorable evidence, his writ was denied because he had not first filed a writ in state court. His case was important for helping to establish that a conviction based upon false evidence violates due process. Mooney was pardoned in 1939 by Governor Culbert Olson. | | | | |
| Aug 8, 1917 | John Snowden | Murder | Annapolis, Maryland | Death by hanging | Executed | Yes |
| Aug 8, 1917 | John Snowden | In 1917, John Snowden, a black man, was charged with the murder of Lottie May Brandon, a pregnant white woman, in Annapolis. His conviction was based on the testimony of two neighbors that a man resembling Snowden had left the victim's house. Snowden never confessed to the murder and was likely tortured by the police while in custody. Maintained his innocence to the end, Snowden was executed on February 28, 1919. In 2001, Snowden was posthumously pardoned by Governor Parris Glendening. | | | | |

== 1920s ==
| Date of crime | Defendant(s) | Crime | Location | Sentence | Time served | Legally exonerated |
|---|---|---|---|---|---|---|
| 1920 | Nicola Sacco and Bartolomeo Vanzetti | Murders of Alessandro Berardelli and Frederick Parmenter during an armed robbery | Braintree, Massachusetts | Death | Executed | No |
| 1920 | Nicola Sacco and Bartolomeo Vanzetti | In 1977, as the 50th anniversary of the executions approached, Massachusetts Governor Michael Dukakis asked the Office of the Governor's Legal Counsel to report on "whether there are substantial grounds for believing—at least in the light of the legal standards of today—that Sacco and Vanzetti were unfairly convicted and executed" and to recommend appropriate action. The resulting "Report to the Governor in the Matter of Sacco and Vanzetti" detailed grounds for doubting that the trial was conducted fairly in the first instance, and argued as well that such doubts were reinforced by "later-discovered or later-disclosed evidence." The report questioned prejudicial cross-examination that the trial judge allowed, the judge's hostility, the fragmentary nature of the evidence, and eyewitness testimony that came to light after the trial. It found the judge's charge to the jury troubling because it emphasized the defendants' behavior at the time of their arrest and highlighted certain physical evidence that was later called into question. The report dismissed the argument that the trial had been subject to judicial review, noting, "the system for reviewing murder cases at the time ... failed to provide the safeguards now present." Based on recommendations of the Office of Legal Counsel, Dukakis declared August 23, 1977, the 50th anniversary of their execution, as Nicola Sacco and Bartolomeo Vanzetti Memorial Day. His proclamation, issued in English and Italian, stated that Sacco and Vanzetti had been unfairly tried and convicted, and that "any disgrace should be forever removed from their names." However, Dukakis did not pardon the two men as many had urged him to do, feeling that this would imply they were guilty; as such, their convictions were not expunged in spite of the admission that their convictions were unjust. | | | | |
| April 1928 | Louise Butler and George Yelder | Murder* | Lowndes County, Alabama | Life imprisonment | Two months | Yes |
| April 1928 | Louise Butler and George Yelder | Butler and Yelder were sentenced to life imprisonment after Butler's daughter testified that they had killed Yelder's niece, Topsy Warren, and dismembered her body. However, less than a week later the local sheriff found Topsy Warren alive. Butler and Yelder were officially pardoned and released in June. | | | | |
| Mar 14, 1929 | Robert Coleman | Murder | Jonesboro, Georgia | Life imprisonment | Four years | Yes |
| Mar 14, 1929 | Robert Coleman | Robert Coleman was convicted of beating his wife to death due to bloodstains on his overalls. He was sentenced to life on a chain gang. Four years into Coleman's sentence, murderer Rader Davis was arrested and pointed the police to burglar James Starks (or Sparks), who Davis said had confessed to murdering Mrs. Coleman while sharing a cell with him. Starks soon admitted the crime, telling police he had crushed Mrs. Coleman's skull with a fire poker after she caught him burgling her house, and Coleman was pardoned by Governor Eugene Talmadge while Starks was sentenced to life on the chain gang. | | | | |

== 1930s ==
| Date of crime | Defendant(s) | Crime | Location | Sentence | Time served | Legally exonerated |
|---|---|---|---|---|---|---|
| Oct 3, 1930 | Alexander McClay Williams | Murder | Delaware County, Pennsylvania | Death by electrocution | Executed | Yes |
| Oct 3, 1930 | Alexander McClay Williams | Williams, a 16-year-old black teenager, confessed to the murder and attempted rape of Vida Robare, a white matron at his reform school. At his racially charged trial, he protested that he only confessed because he was promised that his confession would help him to avoid the death penalty. He was executed on June 8, 1931, becoming the youngest person ever executed by the state of Pennsylvania. In 2015, his attorney's great-grandson, Samuel Lemon, spearheaded efforts to renew interest in Williams' case. In 2022, following a posthumous review of Williams' case, his conviction was overturned, and all charges against him were dismissed, effectively exonerating him. | | | | |
| Mar 24, 1931 | Scottsboro Boys | Rape | Paint Rock, Alabama | Varied, 8 were sentenced to death (none executed) | 6–17 years | Yes |
| Mar 24, 1931 | Scottsboro Boys | Following an altercation with a group of white teens, nine young black men and teenage boys were accused of rape by two women, Ruby Bates and Victoria Price. The Scottsboro case is considered a landmark case, prohibiting racial discrimination in the jury selection process, as no blacks were allowed to be considered to serve on the jury before which the teenagers would be tried. | | | | |
| Dec 9, 1932 | Joseph Majczek and Theodore Marcinkiewicz | Murder | Chicago, Illinois | 99 years (both) | 11 years | Yes |
| Dec 9, 1932 | Joseph Majczek and Theodore Marcinkiewicz | Majczek and Marcinkiewicz were arrested and convicted of the murder of 57-year-old Chicago police officer William D. Lundy on December 9, 1932. Initially, officials held 10 youths in custody on suspicion of killing the officer. Some 11 1/2 years later in 1944, following the intervention of Chicago Times reporters John McPhaul and James McGuire, both men were exonerated of the crime. The real killers have never been identified. | | | | |
| Aug 26, 1936 | Joe Arridy | Murder | Pueblo, Colorado | Death by lethal gas | Executed | Yes |
| Aug 26, 1936 | Joe Arridy | Arridy was convicted and executed for the 1936 killing of 15-year-old Dorothy Drain with a hatchet. In 2011, Gov. Bill Ritter posthumously pardoned Arridy. Ritter said an overwhelming amount of evidence suggests Arridy did not commit the crime and was likely not in Pueblo at the time of the crime. The victim's sister had testified that the murder was committed by Frank Aguilar (who was convicted of helping to kill Drain and executed two years before Arridy) and that Arridy was not involved. Prior to his execution, Aguilar said he had acted alone and was coerced into implicating Arridy. | | | | |

== 1940s ==
| Date of crime | Defendant(s) | Crime | Location | Sentence | Time served | Legally exonerated |
|---|---|---|---|---|---|---|
| Mar 23, 1944 | George Stinney Jr. | Murder | Alcolu, South Carolina | Death by electrocution | Executed | Yes |
| Mar 23, 1944 | George Stinney Jr. | Stinney, a 14-year-old African-American, was convicted of the murders of two white girls: Betty June Binnicker (11) and Mary Emma Thames (8). No physical evidence existed in the case, and the sole evidence against Stinney was the circumstantial fact that the girls had spoken with Stinney and his sister shortly before their murder. Three police officers claimed that Stinney had confessed to the murders, though Stinney claimed that the officers starved him into confessing. Stinney's trial lasted only two and a half hours, where all African-Americans including Stinney's family were denied entry, the all-white jury found him guilty after ten minutes of deliberation, and Judge Philip H. Stoll sentenced him to death. Governor Olin D. Johnston denied several requests for clemency in the two months following and Stinney became the youngest confirmed person to be executed in the United States in the 20th century. Seventy years after his death on December 17, 2014, Stinney's conviction was vacated by circuit court judge Carmen Mullen, effectively clearing his name, and in January 2022 state representative Cezar McKnight introduced a bill titled the George Stinney Fund, which would make the state of South Carolina pay $10 million to the families of the wrongfully executed if their conviction is posthumously overturned. | | | | |
| Oct 1944 | Iva Toguri D'Aquino | Treason* | Tokyo, Japan | 10 years | 6 years | Yes |
| Oct 1944 | Iva Toguri D'Aquino | Toguri was an American citizen who was stranded in Japan during World War II and forced to take part in Japanese radio broadcasts. She refused to broadcast enemy propaganda and used the money given to her by the Japanese to feed American prisoners. After Japan's defeat she was prosecuted for treason by the US government (despite initial investigations finding that she had committed no crime) and convicted, based on perjured testimony, of broadcasting false information intended to demoralise American troops. Toguri was released from prison after six years. Her innocence was not widely known until 1976, when the two main witnesses against her told a Chicago Tribune journalist that they had been coerced into giving false testimony under the threat of being prosecuted themselves. Toguri was pardoned by Gerald Ford in 1977 and was later given an award by the American Veterans Center for aiding POWs while in Japan. | | | | |
| July 30, 1945 | Charles B. McVay III | Sinking of USS Indianapolis | Pacific Ocean | Loss of numbers in rank | N/A (non-custodial sentence) | Yes |
| July 30, 1945 | Charles B. McVay III | USS Indianapolis was torpedoed by the Japanese I-58 submarine on July 30, 1945 while en route to Leyte, resulting in the deaths of 879 of the 1,195-man crew. The ship's captain, Charles McVay, survived the sinking and was later court-martialled for his alleged responsibility. He was convicted of having failed to zig-zag to avoid being hit by the torpedo; however, the I-58's commander, Mochitsura Hashimoto, had testified that zig-zagging would not have stopped him from sinking the ship, and American submarine experts also stated that zig-zagging was not practical under the circumstances anyway. It was later revealed that the navy were aware of enemy submarines in the area but did not warn McVay or afford any protection to Indianapolis, leading historians to believe that McVay was scapegoated to conceal the navy's responsibility for the sinking. In 2000, the U.S. Congress and President Bill Clinton passed a resolution officially exonerating McVay. | | | | |
| July 16, 1949 | Groveland Four | Rape | Lake County, Florida | Varied | Varied | Yes |
| July 16, 1949 | Groveland Four | The Groveland Four (Ernest Thomas, Charles Greenlee, Samuel Shepherd, and Walter Irvin) were falsely accused of raping 17-year-old Norma Padgett and assaulting her husband on July 16, 1949, in Lake County, Florida. Thomas fled and was killed on July 26, 1949, by a sheriff's posse of 1,000 white men. Greenlee, Shepherd and Irvin were arrested and beaten to coerce confessions. The three survivors were convicted at trial by an all-white jury. Greenlee was sentenced to life because he was only 16; the other two were sentenced to death. In 1949, the Florida NAACP organized a campaign against the wrongful conviction and in 1951, the U.S. Supreme Court overturned the convictions and remanded the case to the lower court for a new trial. In November 1951, Sheriff Willis V. McCall of Lake County, Florida shot Irvin and Shepherd while they were in his custody and claimed they had tried to escape while being transported for the new trial. Shepherd died on the spot; Irvin survived and told Federal Bureau of Investigation investigators that McCall had shot them in cold blood and that his deputy had also shot him in an attempt to kill him. At the second trial, Irvin was represented by Thurgood Marshall and again convicted by an all-white jury and sentenced to death. In 1955, his death sentence was commuted to life in prison by recently elected Governor LeRoy Collins. He was paroled in 1968 and died the next year. Greenlee was paroled in 1962 and lived with his family until he died in 2012. On November 22, 2021, Judge Heidi Davis granted the state's motion to posthumously exonerate the men. | | | | |

== 1950s ==
| Date of crime | Defendant(s) | Crime | Location | Sentence | Time served | Legally exonerated |
|---|---|---|---|---|---|---|
| Jun 4, 1951 | Mack Ingram | Attempted rape* | Yanceyville, North Carolina | Two years with hard labour | 1.5 years | Yes |
| Jun 4, 1951 | Mack Ingram | Mack (or Matt) Ingram, a Black farmer, visited the farm of his white neighbour Aubrey Boswell on June 4, 1951, to borrow a wagon. He mistook Boswell's daughter Willa for Boswell due to how she was dressed and followed her, trying to get her attention; when Willa noticed him, she interpreted his behaviour as threatening and ran away, later accusing him of attempting to rape her based entirely on the fact that he had supposedly "leered" at her. Ingram was convicted of assault with intent to rape despite no physical contact having taken place. After numerous appeals by the NAACP on Ingram's behalf, the North Carolina Supreme Court dismissed the charges in 1953, declaring that no actual crime had been committed. | | | | |
| Sep 30, 1953 | Tommy Lee Walker | Murder | Dallas, Texas | Death by electrocution | Executed | No |
| Sep 30, 1953 | Tommy Lee Walker | On the night of September 30, 1953, Venice Lorraine Parker, a white woman, was raped and murdered under a bridge near the Dallas Love Field. Witness testimony indicated that a young black man was responsible for the murder. On the night of January 29, Tommy Lee Walker, a 19-year-old black man, was arrested and charged with the murder. On January 30, he signed a written confession, in which he admitted to cutting Parker's throat while robbing her. Walker quickly recanted his confession. At Walker's trial, two witnesses testified that they saw a black man at the scene of the murder just minutes before it was committed. However, there was no physical evidence linking Walker to the murder. In addition, Walker's underaged girlfriend, 14-year-old Mary Louise Smith, whom he impregnated when he was 18 and she was 13, testified that he was with her on the night of the murder since she was giving birth. Under state law, Walker would have been guilty of statutory rape, which was a capital offense at the time. However, he was never charged with statutory rape and only stood trial for murder. Eight other witnesses testified in support of this alibi, saying Walker, who lived five miles away and did not own a car, was with Smith that night. It is unclear whether the prosecutor ever used the illegal nature of Walker's relationship with his girlfriend to discredit the witnesses, who were aware of it, albeit he attacked discrepancies in their testimony. On March 29, 1954, Walker was convicted of murder and sentenced to death. After losing his appeal, he was executed on May 12, 1956. On January 21, 2026, Walker was posthumously exonerated by the Dallas County Commissioners Court, but this decision is not legally binding. | | | | |
| Jul 4, 1954 | Sam Sheppard | Murder of Marilyn Sheppard | Bay Village, Ohio | Life imprisonment | 12 years | Yes |
| Jul 4, 1954 | Sam Sheppard | On the night of July 3-4, 1954, Marilyn Reese Sheppard was beaten to death in her bed. Her husband Sam, who had also suffered injuries in the alleged attack, claimed that an intruder had broken into the house and attacked Marilyn, knocking him out when he tried to intervene. The media were convinced that Sam was the guilty party, with the Cleveland Press in particular vilifying him as a murderer and calling for his arrest and conviction, and this appears to have influenced both the police investigation and jury deliberations as the jury were not sequestered. Sam had suffered injuries consistent with the alleged attack, and two witnesses had seen a man resembling the alleged intruder near the Sheppard home on the day. His conviction was overturned by the U.S. Supreme Court in the 1966 case Sheppard v. Maxwell after it was found that the media coverage had prevented him from getting a fair trial. At Sam's second trial, evidence was presented showing that the killer was left-handed (Sam was right-handed). Sam was found not guilty on November 16, 1966. | | | | |
| Jun 3, 1957 | Jack McCullough | Murder of Maria Ridulph | Sycamore, Illinois | Life imprisonment | 5 years | Yes |
| Jun 3, 1957 | Jack McCullough | After investigation of a cold case, in 2012 Jack McCullough was exonerated of murder, as it was decided his prosecution had been based on hearsay evidence and concealment of exculpatory evidence. FBI files proving he was nowhere near the scene at the time were excluded by the prosecution from evidence. | | | | |
| Oct 1958 | James Thompson and David Simpson | Child molestation* | Monroe, North Carolina | Indefinite sentence in reformatory school | Three months | Yes |
| Oct 1958 | James Thompson and David Simpson | In October 1958, a prepubescent white girl named Sissy Marcus kissed two black boys, James Thompson (9) and David Simpson (7), on their cheeks while they were playing together. She later mentioned it to her mother, who flew into a rage and accused Thompson and Simpson of sexually assaulting her daughter. Both boys were detained for six days with no access to legal counsel before Juvenile Judge Hampton Price convicted them both of molesting Sissy Marcus, remarking later that he knew they were guilty because they didn't deny it when asked. Price sentenced both boys to be sent to reform school indefinitely. After three months Governor Luther H. Hodges pardoned the two under massive international pressure and they were discharged from reform school. | | | | |

== 1960s ==
| Date of crime | Defendant(s) | Crime | Location | Sentence | Time served | Legally exonerated |
|---|---|---|---|---|---|---|
| Jun 3, 1961 | Clarence Earl Gideon | Breaking and entering, petty theft | Panama City, Florida | 5 years | 2 years | Yes |
| Jun 3, 1961 | Clarence Earl Gideon | Gideon had been denied an attorney at the time of his first trial. At the time, the state of Florida did not have public defenders in all judicial circuits and the law did not require the court to appoint an attorney to the indigent. After conviction, he handwrote a petition for writ of certiorari to the U.S. Supreme Court. The justices considered the matter as Gideon v. Wainwright and ruled unanimously that Gideon's rights had been violated. When he was retried with a defense attorney, it was determined that the primary prosecution witness had committed the crime. The case inspired the book Gideon's Trumpet and a film adaptation by the same name. | | | | |
| Apr 16, 1963 | James Dean Walker | Murder | North Little Rock, Arkansas | Death (commuted to life imprisonment) | 12 years (originally), 6 years (following escape and recapture) | No |
| Apr 16, 1963 | James Dean Walker | After getting into a bar fight, police shot Walker five times, during which Officer Jerrell Vaughan was killed. Despite Walker's gun not having been fired, he was convicted of murder. He spend several years in prison before escaping during a furlough, remaining free for four years in Nevada. Although he fought extradition back to Arkansas due to its poor prison conditions, he was sent back. In 1985 his conviction was overturned due to evidence showing he did not fire at the officer, and the following year he pled no contest to manslaughter and was sentenced to time served. | | | | |
| Apr 23, 1964 | George Whitmore Jr. | Attempted rape | Brownsville, Brooklyn, New York | 5 to 10 years | 7 years | Yes |
| Apr 23, 1964 | George Whitmore Jr. | 21-year-old nurse Elba Borrero was attacked near her home by an assailant who tried to rape her but was chased away by a police patrolman. The same patrolman stopped George Whitmore five hours later while searching for the assailant, but concluded that he was too short to be the same person. The following day Whitmore was questioned further and was identified by Borrero as her attacker. While Whitmore was in custody, police wrongly identified a woman in a photo he had on him as Janet Wylie, one of the victims in the Career Girls Murders, which led to Whitmore being beaten by the police until he confessed to those murders, the attack on Elba Borrero, and the murder of Minnie Edmonds eleven days before the attack on Borrero. Whitmore was convicted of the attempted rape of Elba Borrero, but sentencing was deferred while he went on trial for the murders. However, while Whitmore was awaiting trial, another man named Richard Robles confessed to the Career Girls Murders and the charges against Whitmore for those murders were dropped (Robles would later be convicted of the murders). Two months later Whitmore's conviction was vacated by the trial judge due to racial bias by the jury. Despite Robles' conviction effectively discrediting Whitmore's confession, prosecutors vowed to try Whitmore again; a jury failed to reach a verdict on the murder of Minnie Edmonds, but Whitmore's second trial for the attack on Elba Borrero ended in a guilty verdict. He was sentenced to 5 to 10 years in prison. He was then given a third trial in 1967 after his coerced confession was declared inadmissible, but was convicted yet again on the strength of Borrero's testimony. In December 1972, a journalist investigating Whitmore's case discovered that Borrero, contrary to her trial testimony, had identified another man as her attacker before identifying Whitmore, a fact which had been withheld at all three of Whitmore's trials. District Attorney Eugene Gold re-opened the case and confirmed the accuracy of the journalist's claims before formally requesting that Whitmore's conviction be vacated. On April 10, 1973, the Brooklyn Supreme Court officially vacated Whitmore's conviction and exonerated him. | | | | |
| Feb 21, 1965 | Muhammad Abdul Aziz and Khalil Islam | Assassination of Malcolm X | Manhattan, New York | Life imprisonment | 20 years (Aziz) and 22 years (Islam) | Yes |
| Feb 21, 1965 | Muhammad Abdul Aziz and Khalil Islam | Aziz and Islam were convicted of the murder of Malcolm X based on mistaken witness ID and official misconduct, despite Thomas Hagan, one of Malcolm X's actual killers, testifying that Aziz and Islam had nothing to do with the murder. Due to questions over their guilt, the two men were paroled in the 1980s. Aziz was paroled in 1985 and Islam was paroled in 1987. Both men were officially exonerated in 2021, although only Aziz was still alive. | | | | |
| Mar 12, 1965 | Henry Tameleo, Louis Greco, Joe Salvati, Peter Limone | Murder of Edward Deegan | Chelsea, Massachusetts | Death (commuted to life imprisonment; Tameleo, Greco, and Limone), life imprisonment (Salvati) | 17–33 years (Tameleo and Greco died in prison) | Yes |
| Mar 12, 1965 | Henry Tameleo, Louis Greco, Joe Salvati, Peter Limone | Bonanno crime family gangster Edward Deegan was gunned down in Massachusetts in revenge for robberies he had committed against the Patriarca crime family. Patriarca family hitman and FBI informant Joseph Barboza named six people who, he alleged, had been involved in Deegan's murder. All six were convicted; four received the death penalty, but their sentences were commuted to life after Furman v. Georgia, while the other two received life sentences. In 1970, Barboza recanted his testimony and confessed that four of the men - Henry Tameleo, Louis Greco, Joseph Salvati, and Peter Limone - were not involved in the crime. Appeals against the convictions were denied and Tameleo and Greco both died while serving their sentences. In 2001, secret FBI documents were found revealing that the FBI had evidence proving that the murder was committed by Barboza and Vincent Flemmi without the aid of the four men, but had allowed Barboza to perjure himself in order to keep Barboza and Flemmi as informants. Salvati and Limone were freed from prison in January 2001 after their convictions were vacated, with the court also posthumously exonerating Tameleo and Greco. | | | | |
| Jun 17, 1966 | Rubin Carter and John Artis | Murder | Paterson, New Jersey | Life imprisonment | 19 years | Yes |
| Jun 17, 1966 | Rubin Carter and John Artis | Carter was a professional boxer who was twice convicted of the murders of James Oliver, Fred Nauyoks, and Hazel Tanis, along with his friend and fellow defendant John Artis. Carter's second conviction was overturned in 1985. Carter inspired the 1975 Bob Dylan song "Hurricane", and the film The Hurricane (1999) was based on his case. | | | | |
| Oct 25, 1967 | James Joseph Richardson | Murder | Arcadia, Florida | Death (commuted to life imprisonment) | 21 years | Yes |
| Oct 25, 1967 | James Joseph Richardson | James Richardson was convicted of poisoning his seven children with pesticides and sentenced to death. Authorities believe that it is likely that a neighbor, Bessie Reece, committed the murders. After she developed Alzheimer's disease, she confessed more than 100 times to the murders of these children to her caregivers at the nursing home. At the time of the crime, Reece was on parole after being convicted of the poisoning death of her late husband. Reece was not investigated thoroughly at the time, but she was the last known person to see the children alive, and the last to feed them. She had at first denied going into their apartment. | | | | |
| Aug 28, 1968 | Rennie Davis, David Dellinger, Tom Hayden, Abbie Hoffman, Jerry Rubin | Crossing state lines to incite a riot | Chicago, Illinois | 5 years | 2 years | Yes |
| Aug 28, 1968 | Rennie Davis, David Dellinger, Tom Hayden, Abbie Hoffman, Jerry Rubin | Five members of the Chicago Seven, a group of left-wing activists prosecuted for allegedly inciting a riot during the 1968 Democratic National Convention protests. The violence was in fact caused by officers of the Chicago Police Department who were attempting to suppress the protests. During the trial, Judge Julius Hoffman "went out of his way to constrict or alienate the defense", including holding defendants and their attorneys in contempt for minor infractions and refusing to allow key evidence to be shown to the jury. Five of the eight defendants were found guilty of offences under the Anti-Riot Act, but all convictions were overturned by the United States Court of Appeals for the Seventh Circuit two years later. | | | | |
| Dec 18, 1968 | Geronimo Pratt | Murder | Santa Monica, California | Life imprisonment | 25 years | Yes |
| Dec 18, 1968 | Geronimo Pratt | Pratt, a member of the Black Panther Party, was convicted of murdering Caroline Olsen during a robbery on a tennis court. After 25 years, his conviction was vacated in 1997. It was found that the prosecution had concealed evidence proving that Pratt was 400 miles away when the murder was committed. | | | | |

== 1970s ==
| Date of crime | Defendant(s) | Crime | Location | Sentence | Time served | Legally exonerated |
|---|---|---|---|---|---|---|
| February 6, 1971 | Wilmington Ten | Arson and conspiracy | Wilmington, North Carolina | Varied | Varied | Yes |
| February 6, 1971 | Wilmington Ten | During three days of racial violence in Wilmington, North Carolina, Mike's Grocery, a white-owned grocery store was firebombed by unidentified individuals, who then fired shots at emergency responders when they arrived at the scene. The authorities accused civil rights activist Benjamin Chavis of committing the crime alongside eight Wilmington high school students, all of whom were black. Anne Sheppard Turner, a white social worker, was accused of being an accessory to the bombing. Known as the "Wilmington Ten", the defendants were found guilty in 1972 of arson and conspiracy to assault emergency workers. The case received international condemnation from human rights groups and prominent political figures, with Amnesty International describing the Ten as political prisoners. In 1976 and 1977, three prosecution witnesses recanted their testimony and claimed they had been bribed or coerced into accusing the defendants. Allen Hall, the only witness who claimed to have seen the defendants burning Mike's Grocery, said that he had been ordered by police to incriminate Chavis while in custody for an unrelated assault, and that officers had given him drugs in return for his cooperation. Another witness, Jerome Mitchell, claimed that prosecutors had given him handwritten notes telling him what to say. Governor Jim Hunt commuted all sentences in January 1978, although he refused to pardon the defendants, and in 1980 the Wilmington Ten's convictions were overturned by a federal court on the grounds that prosecutors had concealed evidence of Hall's dishonesty under oath. Decades later, Governor Bev Perdue issued a full pardon for all members of the Wilmington Ten, four of whom had since died. | | | | |
| June 26, 1971 | Richard Phillips | Murder | Detroit, Michigan | Life without parole | 45.7 years | Yes |
| June 26, 1971 | Richard Phillips | Richard Phillips was 25 years old when he was imprisoned for a fatal shooting in Detroit in 1971—a case prosecutors later said was "based entirely" on false testimony from one witness. He was sentenced to life without parole. He was released in 2017 and exonerated in 2018 after the University of Michigan's Innocence Project took up his case, declaring him the longest-serving innocent man in the United States, although his record has since been broken. In prison Phillips taught himself to paint watercolors. He painted custom greeting cards for other inmates to send to their families, and used the proceeds to buy more art supplies. Phillips painted and saved hundreds of original watercolors, now on display in his gallery. As the gallery describes, "He painted to stave off the loneliness. He painted to break up the monotony. He painted to fill the long days. He painted to keep his heart soft and hope alive." | | | | |
| June 5, 1972 | Anthony Mazza | Murder | Boston, Massachusetts | Life without parole | 47.3 years | Yes |
| June 5, 1972 | Anthony Mazza | A Massachusetts jury found Mazza guilty of first degree murder and robbery based on his answers often contradicting his statements to police and to the grand jury due to Mazza having a developmental disability and that he was functionally illiterate and had been in special-education classes for most of his time in school which was not revealed to the jury at his trial. He is now the second-longest-serving innocent man in the United States. | | | | |
| 1972 | Wilbert Jones | Sexual assault | Baton Rouge, Louisiana | Life without parole | 44.7 years | Yes |
| 1972 | Wilbert Jones | A Louisiana jury found Jones guilty of aggravated rape based solely on the victim's testimony. The victim expressed some uncertainty about her identification of Jones in a lineup, e.g., "[the victim] described her attacker variously as 5 feet 8 inches tall, 5 five feet 9 inches tall, and 6 feet 3 inches tall. She said he had a single gap between his front teeth and a smooth, soft voice. ... [After identifying Jones as the perpetrator] she expressed concern because Jones' voice was "rougher" than her attacker's, and because Jones was only 5 feet 3 inches tall ...." The prosecution did not tell the defense about a serial rapist who had been arrested recently and fit the victim's [in Wilbert Jones' case] description. Louisiana incarcerated Jones for nearly 45 years before Innocence Project New Orleans helped him petition for a new trial. A district judge vacated Jones' conviction and ordered a new trial. The prosecution appealed to the Louisiana Supreme Court, but the state's highest court rejected the appeal. The prosecution dismissed the charges on October 11, 2018. Jones' nearly 45 years in prison was the second longest time spent incarcerated after a known wrongful conviction in U.S. history at the time. | | | | |
| June 3, 1973 | Chol Soo Lee | Murder | San Francisco, California | Life imprisonment | 9.8 years | Yes |
| June 3, 1973 | Chol Soo Lee | Lee was convicted of the shooting death of Chinatown gang leader Yip Yee Tak and sentenced to life in prison. While behind bars, Lee was also convicted of killing Morrison Needham, a member of the Aryan Brotherhood, in a prison yard, which he claimed was self-defense, and sentenced to death. In 1982 Lee was retried and acquitted of Tak's murder. He was released from prison on March 28, 1983, after his conviction in the Needham case was also overturned. Later that year, he pleaded guilty to second degree murder for killing Needham and was sentenced to time served. As a result of his conviction, he was not given an apology nor compensation from the state. | | | | |
| Sep 25, 1973 | Teryl Suff | Murder | Fort Worth, Texas | 70 years | Three years | Yes |
| Sep 25, 1973 | Teryl Suff | Teryl and her husband William Suff were convicted of the murder of their two-month-old daughter Dijanet, who died from internal injuries after suffering prolonged physical abuse. The evidence showed that William was the perpetrator of the abuse and that Teryl was likely aware of his violence towards Dijanet, but nothing suggested she had ever abused Dijanet herself. Both Suffs appealed against their convictions, and in 1976 the Texas Court of Criminal Appeals overturned Teryl's conviction while upholding William's, finding that the evidence only proved she was "to understate the matter, a poor mother" and there was nothing linking her to the murder except "innuendo bolstered by moral outrage". | | | | |
| Sep 28, 1973 | Peter Reilly | Manslaughter | Falls Village, Connecticut | 6-16 years | Two years | Yes |
| Sep 28, 1973 | Peter Reilly | Barbara Gibbons' mutilated corpse was found by her son Peter Reilly on September 28, 1973. Police quickly made him their prime suspect, based solely on his presence at the scene and what they felt to be an unusual lack of emotion. He was interrogated at length for 24 hours, having voluntarily agreed not to have an attorney present, and eventually confessed to the crime after being subjected to oppressive interrogation tactics. Reilly was ultimately convicted of manslaughter rather than murder. In 1976 he received a new trial; two witnesses, including a state trooper, had seen Reilly driving his car when the murder was believed to have happened, leaving him without enough time to get back home, commit the murder, and dispose of all the evidence before the police arrived. The charges against Reilly were dismissed in November. | | | | |
| 1974 | Gregory Bright | Murder | New Orleans, Louisiana | Life imprisonment | 27.5 years | Yes |
| 1974 | Gregory Bright | Bright was convicted of second degree murder in 1974 at the age of 20. After several years of appeals, Bright was granted a new trial in 2001 on the grounds that the prosecution had withheld evidence from the defense in his previous trial. On June 24, 2003, after 27 1/2 years in prison for a crime they did not commit, Bright and Earl Truvia were both released after the Orleans Parish district attorney dismissed all charges. Bright speaks around the country about his wrongful incarceration and life since prison. In 2010, Bright joined Innocence Project New Orleans as Assistant Education and Outreach Director. | | | | |
| February 3, 1974 | Delbert Tibbs | Murder and rape | Fort Myers, Florida | Death by electrocution | 3 years | Yes |
| February 3, 1974 | Delbert Tibbs | Teenager Cynthia Nadeau was raped and her boyfriend, Terry Milroy, was murdered by a man who picked them up while hitchhiking. Despite an alibi, Tibbs was convicted on the basis of a false eyewitness identification and an alleged confession to a fellow inmate. In 2011, Tibbs was instrumental in the decision of Governor Pat Quinn to repeal the death penalty in Illinois. | | | | |
| March 17, 1974 | Inez García | Murder* | Soledad, California | Life imprisonment | 15 months | Yes |
| March 17, 1974 | Inez García | Inez García was raped and battered by Miguel Jimenez and Luis Castillo. Later that night Jimenez called her and threatened to kill her; when García and her roommate Fred Medrano confronted them, Castillo began beating Medrano and Jimenez brandished a knife towards García, who shot and killed him. The police accused her of lying about the rape, although she had told multiple friends and relatives before and immediately after the confrontation that she was raped, and said she had killed Jimenez over a drug-related dispute. García was convicted of second degree murder and served two years in prison before she was given a new trial and acquitted on the grounds of self-defense. | | | | |
| May 15, 1974 | Michael Lloyd Self | Murder | Galveston, Texas | Life imprisonment | 24 years | No |
| May 15, 1974 | Michael Lloyd Self | Teenagers Rhonda Johnson and Sharon Shaw disappeared while at a beach in Galveston, Texas, on August 4, 1971; their remains were found in a marsh in January 1972. Though Michael Lloyd Self, a local sex offender, wrote a confession, he contended that police officers forced him to do so at gunpoint. Self was sentenced to life imprisonment in 1975. In 1976, two of the officers who took his confession were arrested for numerous bank robberies and sentenced to 30–50 years. In 1998, Edward Harold Bell, a convicted serial killer, admitted to the murders of Johnson and Shaw, though no direct connection could be made. Self died in prison in 2000 of cancer. Numerous investigators, a Galveston police officer, and a former Harris County prosecutor all protested Self's conviction. | | | | |
| December 30, 1974 | Glynn Simmons | Murder | Edmond, Oklahoma | Death (commuted to life imprisonment) | 48 years | Yes |
| December 30, 1974 | Glynn Simmons | Mistaken Witness ID, Perjury or False Accusation, Official Misconduct, and Inadequate Legal Defense caused him to be found guilty. Exonerated in December 2023. He holds the record for the longest-serving innocent man in the United States. | | | | |
| Mar 29, 1975 | David Bryant | Murder | Bronx, New York | Life imprisonment | 40 years, 9 months | Yes |
| Mar 29, 1975 | David Bryant | In March 1975 8-year old Karen Smith was found dead in a stairwell of her apartment building. Previously charged twice for sexual misconduct, David Bryant was taken in as a suspect the same day and was convicted to serve 25 years to life in prison in October 1976. Bryant was briefly released in 2013 but was taken back to prison in 2014, until finally being released in 2018 and having his charges dismissed in 2019. | | | | |
| Sep 6– Oct 21, 1975 | Ledura Watkins | Murder | Detroit and Highland Park, Michigan | Life without parole | 41 years, 3 months | Yes |
| Sep 6– Oct 21, 1975 | Ledura Watkins | Ledura Watkins was convicted of the murder of 25-year-old public school teacher, Evette Ingram, who was also a drug dealer, based on testimony by Travis Herndon who gave conflicting stories about who had committed the crime. Herndon initially said Ledura Watkins committed the crime; later adding it was at the request of crooked Highland Park police officer Gary Vazana who was known for dealing drugs, and wanted Herndon and Watkins to kill Ingram and take any drugs they found so the drugs could be sold and the three of them could split the proceeds. Vazana was found murdered the same day Herndon began telling his stories to police. The Cooley Law School Innocence Project at Western Michigan University began investigating the case in 2012. In January 2017, they filed a petition for post-conviction relief citing the undisclosed police and laboratory reports, Herndon's recantation, the failure of the prosecution and police to disclose favorable treatment of Herndon in exchange for his testimony, and unreliable hair analysis. On June 15, 2017 the Wayne County Prosecutor's Office joined in supporting the motion which led to the judge vacating Watkins's conviction and the charges being dismissed due to insufficient evidence for a retrial. Watkins filed a federal civil rights lawsuit that was settled in 2021 for $2,350,000. | | | | |
| 1975 | Ricky Jackson, Ronnie Bridgeman, and Wiley Bridgeman | Murder | Cleveland, Ohio | Death (commuted to life imprisonment) | 28–39 years | Yes |
| 1975 | Ricky Jackson, Ronnie Bridgeman, and Wiley Bridgeman | Jackson and both the Bridgeman brothers were convicted and sentenced to death for the killing of Harold Franks, a money order salesman, based on the evidence of a 12-year-old boy, Eddie Vernon, who claimed to have seen them attack Franks. There were no other witnesses nor evidence linking the accused to the crime. In a signed affidavit in 2014, Vernon recanted, saying he had been coerced by the police. Jackson had escaped the death sentence because of a paperwork error. The sentences of the Bridgemans had been commuted to life. Jackson and Wiley Bridgeman were held in prison longer than any other persons who had been exonerated. Ronnie Bridgeman had been paroled after serving 28 years. All three men received compensation and settlements from the state for their wrongful convictions and imprisonment. | | | | |
| May 2, 1976 | Clifford Williams Jr. | Murder, attempted murder | Jacksonville, Florida | Death by electrocution | 42 years, 7 months | Yes |
| Jul 1976 | Charles Ray Finch | Murder | Wilson, North Carolina | Death (commuted to life imprisonment) | 42 years, 11 months | Yes |
| Jul 1976 | Lewis Fogle | Murder and rape | Indiana County, Pennsylvania | Life without parole | 34 years | Yes |
| Jul 1976 | Lewis Fogle | Fogle was convicted in 1982 of raping and killing 15-year-old Deann Katherine Long, who had died in 1976. DNA tests on the semen in the girl's body proved he was not the rapist. In August 2015, a senior judge vacated his conviction. The local district attorney joined in the motion to vacate his conviction, and Fogle was released. | | | | |
| Nov 27, 1976 | Randall Dale Adams | Murder | Dallas, Texas | Death (commuted to life imprisonment) | 12 years | Yes |
| Nov 27, 1976 | Randall Dale Adams | Adams was convicted of killing Dallas police officer Robert W. Wood. In 1988, the film The Thin Blue Line, which was based on the case, was released. Public outcry over the film prompted officials to re-examine the case. Adams was released in 1989. | | | | |
| 1977 | Dewey Bozella | Murder | Poughkeepsie, New York | 20 years to life | 26 years | Yes |
| 1977 | Dewey Bozella | Bozella was accused of killing 92-year-old Emma Kapser. He was convicted on the basis of testimony from two jailhouse informants. DNA testing was not available because evidence from the crime had been destroyed post-conviction. Bozella's first conviction was overturned because the prosecutor removed all African Americans from the jury. He was tried again in December 1990. At the second trial, one witness recanted his prior statements, but Bozella was convicted a second time. The other witness later recanted. In addition, the defense later learned that the prosecution failed to turn over exculpatory evidence to the defense, including a fingerprint recovered from the scene that was linked to a felon. In 2009, Bozella's conviction was overturned and all charges were dropped. | | | | |
| Jun 9, 1977 | Kerry Max Cook | Murder and rape | Tyler, Texas | Death by lethal injection (three subsequent wrongful convictions) | 20 years | Yes |
| Jun 9, 1977 | Kerry Max Cook | Cook was convicted in 1978 for the 1977 rape and murder of Linda Jo Edwards in Smith County, Texas, and endured a series of flawed trials marked by overturned convictions, a hung jury, and a death sentence, amid allegations of police and prosecutorial misconduct. Cook spent 20 years on death row fighting the case before his conviction was vacated, but he remained officially labeled a murderer for decades. In 2024, the Texas Court of Criminal Appeals declared Cook actually innocent, ruling that multiple law enforcement officials had manufactured evidence and suppressed exculpatory information, bringing an end to his decades-long legal battle. Cook's wrongful conviction has since become the subject of numerous books, as well as the play, The Exonerated, where Cook was portrayed by various actors including Richard Dreyfuss and Robin Williams. | | | | |
| Jul 9, 1977 | Gary Dotson | Rape* | Chicago, Illinois | 25–50 years | 6 years (approximately) | Yes |
| Jul 9, 1977 | Gary Dotson | Sixteen-year-old Cathleen Crowell Webb made up a rape allegation to explain her pregnancy concerns to her foster parents after having had consensual sex with her boyfriend the previous day. After a religious conversion, Webb confessed to her pastor that she had wrongly accused Dotson and began efforts to get him released. The prosecution refused to take any action, so they went to the media. The resulting public sympathy led the authorities to review the case. Eventually Dotson was cleared via DNA testing and released. | | | | |
| May 11, 1978 | The Ford Heights Four: Verneal Jimerson, Dennis Williams, Kenneth Adams, and Willie Rainge | Rape, murder | Ford Heights, Illinois | Death (Jimerson, Williams), 75 years (Adams), life (Rainge) | 18 years (Williams, Adams, Rainge), 11 years (Jimerson) | Yes |
| May 11, 1978 | The Ford Heights Four: Verneal Jimerson, Dennis Williams, Kenneth Adams, and Willie Rainge | The Ford Heights Four were convicted of the rape of Carol Schmal and murder of Schmal and Lawrence Lionberg based on false forensic testimony, coercion of a prosecution witness, perjury by another witness who had an incentive to lie, and prosecution and police misconduct. Witness and DNA evidence uncovered in an investigation by three journalism students at Northwestern University cleared the Ford Heights Four and led to the arrest and conviction of the real killers. | | | | |
| May 11, 1978 | Paula Gray | Rape, murder, perjury | Ford Heights, Illinois | 50 years | 9 years | Yes |
| May 11, 1978 | Paula Gray | Paula Gray was an additional suspect in the Ford Heights Four case. Gray, an intellectually disabled teenager, was interrogated for two days before confessing to her involvement in the crime. However, Gray soon recanted her confession, stating that she had been drugged and coached by the police. Upon her recantation, Gray was charged with rape and murder and with perjury. She was ultimately found guilty and sentenced to 50 years in prison. In 1982, after two of the Ford Heights Four won new trials, prosecutors offered to release Gray in exchange for her testimony against the two men. Gray accepted the offer and was released in 1987. Following the exoneration of the Ford Heights Four, Gray's conviction was overturned, and in 2002, the governor issued her a pardon. | | | | |
| Aug 31, 1978 | Joseph Sledge | Murder | Elizabethtown, North Carolina | Life imprisonment | 36 years | Yes |
| Aug 31, 1978 | Joseph Sledge | Sledge escaped from prison during a four-year sentence for misdemeanor larceny and was recaptured days later. During this time, Josephine and Aileen Davis were killed in their home in Elizabethtown, North Carolina. Sledge was convicted of murdering the two women based on the testimony of two inmates who claimed that Sledge had admitted to the crime while in prison the next year. One of the informants later recanted his testimony, saying that he had lied due to police coercion and a reward of early parole and $3,000 prize money. The other informant received similar special treatment. Mitochondrial DNA testing of hairs found at the crime scene believed to be from the killer did not match Sledge, and he was declared innocent in January 2015. He had served more than 36 years for the crime. | | | | |
| Aug 31, 1978 | Bobby Joe Maxwell | Murder | Los Angeles, California | Life without parole | 39 years | Yes |
| Aug 31, 1978 | Bobby Joe Maxwell | Maxwell was falsely believed to be the Skid Row Stabber, and was convicted of two stabbings. | | | | |
| Nov 11, 1978 | Craig Coley | Murder | Simi Valley, California | Life without parole | 39 years | Yes |
| Nov 11, 1978 | Craig Coley | Coley was convicted of the murder of 24-year-old Rhonda Wicht and her 4-year-old son Donald Wicht in 1978. DNA tests not available at the time of his trial later showed Coley could not have done the murders, and DNA from others was present. Police officers testified that the original investigating officer had mishandled the investigation. Coley was pardoned in 2017 after serving 39 years. | | | | |
| Sep 30, 1979 | Kevin Green | Murder, attempted murder, rape | Tustin, California | Life imprisonment | 16 years | Yes |
| Sep 30, 1979 | Kevin Green | On September 30, 1979, Diane Green, who was nine months pregnant with a girl, was assaulted and raped in her apartment by an assailant who beat her into a coma. She was found by her husband Kevin and taken to hospital where doctors decided to perform a caesarean section, but they were unable to save the unborn girl. Diane came out of her coma a month later and was initially unable to identify her attacker; however, she later claimed to have remembered that Kevin attacked her after being refused sex. Based solely on Diane's testimony, Kevin was convicted of her rape and attempted murder and the second-degree murder of their unborn daughter in spite of witnesses who testified he was at a fast food restaurant during the attack. 16 years later, investigators re-opened the case of the "Bedroom Basher" - a serial killer active in California during the 1970s who would break into women's apartments, rape them, and beat them to death with a hammer. DNA testing to try and identify the killer revealed that the DNA profile matched the one taken from Diane Green's rape kit. This profile was later linked to Gerald Parker, who confessed to the attack on Diane Green and the other murders and was sentenced to death in 1999. A judge declared Kevin Green factually innocent in June 1996 and ordered his release. | | | | |
| Nov 23, 1979 | Cornelius Dupree | Aggravated robbery | Dallas, Texas | 75 years | 30 years | Yes |
| Nov 23, 1979 | Cornelius Dupree | Dupree was convicted of aggravated robbery on the basis of eyewitness identification after allegedly robbing and raping a 26-year-old woman during a carjacking. He was later exonerated by the Innocence Project via DNA testing of pubic hair from the rape. | | | | |
| 1979 | Kevin Strickland | Murder | Kansas City, Missouri | Life imprisonment | 42 years, 4 months | Yes |
| 1979 | Kevin Strickland | Strickland was exonerated for three murders and released in 2021 on November 23. His wrongful incarceration of 42 years and 4 months was the longest in Missouri | | | | |
| 1979 | Jerry Frank Townsend | Murder | Broward and Miami-Dade County, Florida | Life imprisonment | 21 years | Yes |
| 1979 | Jerry Frank Townsend | Townsend, an intellectually disabled man with an IQ of 50, was arrested for rape in 1979 and confessed to a number of murders committed in Broward and Miami-Dade counties. He was convicted or pleaded guilty to six of the murders he had confessed to and received seven life sentences. While he was in prison, DNA testing showed that at least two of the murders he had confessed to were in fact victims of serial killer Eddie Mosley, casting doubt on the accuracy of his confession. Further testing cleared him of two more of the murders. At the request of prosecutors, Townsend's conviction was vacated and he walked free after 21 years in prison. | | | | |

== 1980s ==
| Date of crime | Defendant(s) | Crime | Location | Sentence | Time served | Legally exonerated |
|---|---|---|---|---|---|---|
| 1980s | At least 36 people | Child sexual abuse* | Kern County, California | Varied | Varied | Some |
| 1980s | At least 36 people | The Kern County child abuse cases are a notable example of day-care sex-abuse hysteria of the 1980s. The cases involved claims that a pedophile sex ring performed Satanic ritual abuse: as many as 60 young children testified they had been abused. At least 36 people were convicted and most of them spent years imprisoned. 34 convictions were overturned on appeal. Two convicts died in prison. A documentary titled Witch Hunt was produced and released in 2007. MSNBC also did a documentary on John Stoll and the Kern County cases. In 2009, John Stoll sued Kern County and was awarded $5 million in compensation. Prior to the start of the Kern County child abuse cases, several local social workers had attended a training seminar that foregrounded satanic ritual abuse as a major element in child sexual abuse, and had used the now-debunked memoir Michelle Remembers as training material. | | | | |
| 1980s | Cathy Woods | Murder | Reno, Nevada | Life without parole | 35 years | Yes |
| 1980 | Subramanyam Vedam | Murder | State College, Pennsylvania | Life without parole | 43 years | Yes |
| 1980 | Subramanyam Vedam | Wrongfully convicted of the murder of Thomas Kinser; arrested by Immigration and Customs Enforcement immediately after release from prison. | | | | |
| May 6, 1980 | Joyce Ann Brown | Murder, aggravated robbery | Dallas, Texas | Life imprisonment | 9 years, 5 months, 24 days | Yes |
| May 6, 1980 | Joyce Ann Brown | Brown was convicted of robbery in 1980, although the rental car used in the crime had been leased to a different Joyce Ann Brown, who lived in Denver, Colorado. The defendant had a strong alibi, as she was at work at the time of the crime. The conviction was based on eyewitness identification and on testimony of a cellmate that she had confessed. Following investigations by 60 Minutes, The Dallas Morning News, and Centurion Ministries, an appeal was filed. The Texas Court of Criminal Appeals set aside Brown's conviction because of prosecutorial misconduct: they had not revealed that the prosecution witness had been convicted of perjury, and it was not revealed that she received a reduced sentence after testifying. Her record was expunged in 1994. | | | | |
| May 21, 1980 | Kenneth Waters | Murder and robbery | Ayer, Massachusetts | Life without parole | 18 years | Yes |
| May 21, 1980 | Kenneth Waters | Kenneth Waters was convicted on May 11, 1983, for the 1980 murder of Katherina Reitz Brow and was sentenced to life in prison until he was exonerated, with the help of his sister Betty Anne, on March 15, 2001, when DNA test results proved he was not the perpetrator. Waters died in an accident six months later on September 19, 2001. His case became the subject of a 2010 film titled Conviction. In 2025, it was announced that a suspect had been identified through forensic investigation of genealogy data. | | | | |
| Jul 6, 1980 | Clifford Henry Bowen | Murder | Oklahoma City | Death by electrocution | Five years | Yes |
| Jul 6, 1980 | Clifford Henry Bowen | On July 6, 1980, three men were gunned down outside a motel in Oklahoma City. Police suspected that the murders were orchestrated by police officer turned drug dealer Harold Behrens, who believed that one of the men, Ray Peters, was planning to inform on him to the police. A police officer who had worked with Behrens while he was on the force thought the description of the shooter resembled Clifford Bowen, a criminal the two of them had surveilled together, and suspected that Behrens may have hired Bowen to carry out the murders. Two witnesses identified Bowen as the shooter, although Behrens denied knowing Bowen; he was sentenced to life without parole for ordering the murders, having turned down an offer to serve just ten years which would have required him to implicate Bowen. Bowen was convicted despite being able to prove that he was 300 miles away from Oklahoma City when the murders took place and was sentenced to death. His conviction was overturned in 1986 after the prosecution was found to have suppressed evidence which implicated Leonard Lee Crowe as the shooter. | | | | |
| Aug 23, 1980 | Clarence Brandley | Murder and rape | Conroe, Texas | Death by lethal injection | 9 years | Yes |
| Aug 23, 1980 | Clarence Brandley | Brandley was working as a janitor at Conroe High School when 16-year-old Cheryl Dee Fergeson was raped and murdered in the loft above the auditorium following a volleyball game. A foreign blood sample was found on Fergeson's shirt that did not match either Fergeson's or Brandley's blood type. Following conviction, Brandley's defense team discovered that several pieces of exculpatory evidence were not disclosed by the prosecution. Semen had been found at the scene, but was destroyed without being tested. A Caucasian pubic hair was found on the body; Brandley is African American. Also missing were photographs taken of Brandley on the day of the crime showing that he was not wearing the belt that the prosecution claimed had been the murder weapon. The prosecution received statements implicating two other men in the crime, but failed to disclose them. One of the janitors went to police following Brandley's arrest. He told police he saw another janitor leading the victim up the stairs. He alleged that he was threatened with arrest if he didn't implicate Brandley at trial. | | | | |
| Oct 12, 1980 | Steve Titus | Rape | Seattle, Washington | N/A | 1 day | Yes |
| Oct 12, 1980 | Steve Titus | Titus was convicted of the 1980 rape of Nancy Von Roper, a hitchhiking teenager. Seattle Times reporter Paul Henderson began investigating the case after a similar rape was committed a few months after Titus' conviction. His investigation of the case led to Titus' conviction being overturned, and the charges were dropped before he was sentenced. Henderson won the Pulitzer Prize for his articles on the case. Titus lost his job as a result of the case and died of a heart attack in 1985, shortly before being awarded compensation. | | | | |
| Nov 12, 1980 | Sandra Hemme | Murder | St. Joseph, Missouri | 50 years | 43 years | Yes |
| Nov 12, 1980 | Sandra Hemme | Hemme was accused of murdering Patricia Jeschke. However, evidence linked police officer Michael Holman to the crime instead. On June 14, 2024, Judge Ryan Horsman ruled that all evidence linked Holman to the crime and there was no evidence linking Hemme. She served the longest prison service for an American woman wrongfully convicted of a crime. | | | | |
| Dec 21, 1980 | Claus von Bülow | Attempted murder* | Newport, Rhode Island | 30 years | 3 years | Yes |
| Dec 21, 1980 | Claus von Bülow | Claus von Bülow was convicted of attempted murder of his wife, Sunny von Bülow, on the theory that he injected his wife with insulin, sending her into a coma. She was comatose for 28 years until her death in 2008. His conviction was overturned and he was retried. His defense team hired a number of world-class experts who argued that Sunny's coma was caused by a combination of oral medications, alcohol, and chronic health conditions. Also entered into evidence was a hospital admission only three weeks prior to her irreversible coma where she ingested at least 73 aspirin tablets. The defense argued that this act demonstrated Sunny's mental state was such that she once again ingested an overdose of drugs. They also argued that the presence of insulin on the tip of the needle found near Sunny suggested that it had been dipped in the insulin, but not injected, as injecting it would've wiped the needle clean. He was acquitted. | | | | |
| Dec 31, 1980 | Joyce Lukezic and Robert Charles Cruz | Murder, conspiracy to commit murder | Phoenix, Arizona | Not sentenced; Death | 14 years | Yes |
| Dec 31, 1980 | Joyce Lukezic and Robert Charles Cruz | Joyce Lukezic and Robert Charles Cruz were both implicated as masterminds of the home-invasion murders of William "Pat" Redmond and his mother-in-law Helen Phelps on December 31, 1980. Redmond's wife and Phelps' daughter, Marilyn Redmond, survived the attack. Both Lukezic and Cruz were implicated in the contract killing by Arnold Merrill, who alleged that the crime was motivated by the desire to take over Redmond's printing business (Lukezic's husband Ron was business partners with Redmond at the time of the crime). In December 1981, Cruz was tried and convicted for first-degree murder, attempted murder, and conspiracy; he was sentenced to death in January 1982. Lukezic was tried and convicted of the same charges in August 1982. Following her conviction, a new trial was ordered for Lukezic, who was found guilty based on entirely circumstantial evidence. Prosecutors did not disclose that Merrill, a key prosecution witness, was provided with benefits and leniency for his testimony. After a second trial in April-May 1985 ended in a mistrial, Lukezic was acquitted of all charges at her third trial in November 1985. Cruz's death sentenced was overturned in October 1983, and two 1987 retrials ended in mistrials. In 1988, Cruz was convicted again at his fourth trial and re-sentenced to death; that conviction was overturned in 1993 on the basis that Hispanics had been excluded from his jury. In his fifth trial in 1995, Cruz argued that he was framed by Merrill who won immunity for his testimony. Cruz, like Lukezic, was acquitted of all charges. | | | | |
| Aug 14, 1981 | Arthur Lee Whitfield | Rape | Norfolk, Virginia | 63 years | 22 years | Yes |
| Aug 14, 1981 | Arthur Lee Whitfield | In less than one hour on the night of August 14, 1981, two women in Norfolk, Virginia were raped. Both victims eventually identified Arthur Whitfield as the assailant. In 1982, he was convicted of one of the crimes and pled guilty to the second in order to receive a lighter sentence and have some of the charges dropped. DNA testing in 2004 proved that he was innocent of both crimes. The first victim was accosted as she got out of her car. The assailant threatened her with a knife, stole her money, and ordered her to undress. The perpetrator raped her and left her there. She then drove to a friend's house and reported the rape. At trial, she testified that she had several opportunities to view the perpetrator by the light of a streetlight and a spotlight on a nearby house. At the police station, she picked out seven photographs. One of the pictures was Whitfield's. She subsequently identified him from a live lineup. The second victim was attacked not long after the first. She had exited her car and was accosted, threatened with a knife, and raped. At trial, the defense argued that Whitfield had been misidentified. Both victims described their attacker as having no facial hair, but Whitfield wore a beard at the time. Whitfield's family testified that he was with them the entire evening. The jury convicted and Whitfield was sentenced to 45 years. He pled guilty to the second crime and received 18 years, to run consecutively to the first sentence, a total of 63 years. In October 2003, Whitfield filed pro-se under the Virginia statute that governs postconviction DNA testing (passed in 2001). It appeared that the evidence had been destroyed. In December 2003, however, the state crime laboratory found pieces of evidence taped inside a notebook of the serologist who had originally tested the evidence. Mary Jane Burton had, against laboratory protocol, saved samples from some of the cases she had worked on. In 2001, evidence located in a similar manner exonerated Marvin Anderson. In 2003, the evidence Burton saved in Julius Ruffin's case was tested and exonerated him. In 2004, the evidence in Whitfield's case was subjected to DNA testing. Whitfield was excluded from the rape kit samples of both victims. The profile obtained from testing indicated that another inmate, already serving life for another sexual assault, was the true perpetrator. | | | | |
| Sep 7, 1981 | Grover Thompson | Attempted murder | Mount Vernon, Illinois | 40 years | 15 years (died in prison) | Yes |
| Sep 7, 1981 | Grover Thompson | Serial killer Timothy Krajcir broke into the apartment of 72-year-old Ida White and stabbed her in her shower. Thompson, who was sleeping in a post office across the street from White's apartment building, was arrested for the crime; the victim misidentified Krajcir as a black man, as did a man who witnessed the culprit fleeing. Thompson's possession of a pocket knife with a speck of dried blood was used as evidence against him. While confessing to other crimes in return for avoiding the death penalty, Krajcir said he attacked a woman in Mount Vernon and that a "black guy" had been arrested for the crime. Reporter Carly O'Keefe linked the crime to White's stabbing; after work from the Illinois Innocence Project and unsuccessful appeals, Governor Bruce Rauner granted Thompson posthumous executive clemency based on actual innocence. | | | | |
| Sep 18, 1981 | Raymond Towler | Assault, rape | Cleveland, Ohio | 12 years to life, 7–25 years, and 5–25 years | 27 years | Yes |
| Sep 18, 1981 | Raymond Towler | Towler was convicted for the assault of a 12-year-old boy and rape of 11-year-old girl in a wooded area. Towler was exonerated by DNA testing. | | | | |
| Oct 29, 1981 | Ernest Holbrook and Herman Rucker | Murder of Tina Harmon | Lodi, Ohio | Life imprisonment | One year | Yes |
| Oct 29, 1981 | Ernest Holbrook and Herman Rucker | Holbrook and Rucker were accused of the abduction and murder of 12-year-old Tina Harmon in 1982. There was no physical evidence against either man and Holbrook had an alibi for Harmon's abduction, but they were convicted after two eyewitnesses linked them to the crime. However, one of the eyewitnesses was found to be a pathological liar. The other, Holbrook's mentally challenged cousin Curtis Maynard, recanted his testimony and claimed police had pressured him to lie. Rucker was given a new trial in 1983 on the basis of the recantation and was found not guilty. Holbrook was denied a new trial, but the following year his conviction was overturned after evidence came to light implicating Robert Anthony Buell in the crime. Curtis Maynard was convicted of perjury after recanting his testimony and sentenced to six to 20 years in prison. He served 13 months. | | | | |
| Dec 1981 | Gloria Killian | Murder, attempted murder, burglary, robbery, conspiracy | Rosemont, California | Life imprisonment | 20 years | Yes |
| Dec 1981 | Gloria Killian | In December 1981, Gary Masse and Stephen DeSantis, disguised as telephone repairmen, entered the home of an elderly couple in Rosemont, California, shot both occupants and stole six suitcases of silver. Masse's wife told the police that a woman named Gloria masterminded the robbery, prompting the police to arrest 35-year-old Gloria Killian, a former law student with no criminal record. After a preliminary hearing, the charges against Killian were dismissed. Masse was sentenced to life in prison without parole. However, after striking a deal with the Sacramento Sheriff's Department to reduce his sentence in exchange for testimony against others involved, Masse implicated Killian. Killian was re-arrested, and based solely on Masse's testimony, a jury convicted her of first-degree murder, attempted murder, burglary, robbery and conspiracy and sentenced her to 32-years-to-life in prison. Masse's sentence was reduced to 25 years. Ten years later, defense investigators discovered the deal struck between Masse and prosecutors, including a letter where Masse wrote to the prosecutors, "I lied my ass off for you people." Masse later admitted that his testimony against Killian was false. In March 2002, the Ninth Circuit Court of Appeals reversed Killian's conviction, and in August 2002, Killian was released. The prosecutor, Christopher Cleland, was admonished by the California State Bar for his conduct in the case. | | | | |
| Dec 6, 1981 | Julius Ruffin | Rape, sodomy, robbery | Norfolk, Virginia | Life imprisonment | 21 years | Yes |
| Dec 6, 1981 | Julius Ruffin | On December 6, 1981, Julius Ruffin was accused of raping, sodomizing, and robbing a woman in her home. The victim looked for a black male and identified Ruffin as her attacker, though the description did not match up. Ruffin is 6'1" (187 cm), with light skin, and two distinguishable gold teeth and facial hair. She identified her attacker as 5'8" (174 cm) with dark skin. On October 1, 1982, he was sentenced to life in prison. Although the real criminal has been convicted, only one of the 'convicts' has had his name totally cleared. Julius Ruffin received $1.5 million in compensation and has had his name completely erased from the registered sex offender list and his record has been cleared of the crimes. Aaron Doxie III, the real perpetrator, was convicted for unrelated rapes, and will not be tried for the Virginia rapes because the cases are too cold and much of the evidence has been destroyed. | | | | |
| Dec 16, 1981 | Nick Yarris | Murder and rape | Pennsylvania | Death by electrocution | 22 years | Yes |
| Dec 16, 1981 | Nick Yarris | Yarris, facing a possible life sentence for crimes of which he was later acquitted, attempted to strike a deal with prosecutors by falsely implicating another man in the rape-murder of Linda Mae Craig earlier that month. When Yarris' story was disproved, he became the prime suspect and was convicted the following year. After 22 years on death row, Yarris was exonerated by DNA testing and his conviction was overturned. He was released from prison in 2004 after a separate 30-year sentence that he'd received in Florida for armed robbery and false imprisonment, crimes that he had actually committed arom custody in 1985, w s reduced to time served. | | | | |
| 1982 | Ron Williamson and Dennis Fritz | Murder | Ada, Oklahoma | Death (Williamson), life in prison (Fritz) | 11 years | Yes |
| 1982 | Ron Williamson and Dennis Fritz | Debra Carter was murdered in her apartment following a night out with friends at a local bar. Evidence against the men included expert testimony in hair analysis, which is now regarded as unreliable. Ada resident Glen Gore testified against both Williamson and Fritz that Carter had complained to a friend that Williamson "made her nervous". Gore was later connected to the murder by DNA testing and convicted. He is serving life without parole. The case served as the inspiration for John Grisham's The Innocent Man: Murder and Injustice in a Small Town. | | | | |
| Jan 11, 1982 | Alton Logan | Murder | Chicago, Illinois | Life | 26 years | Yes |
| Jan 11, 1982 | Alton Logan | Two African-American men shot and killed Lloyd Wickliffe and wounded Alvin Thompson on January 11, 1982, in an attempted armed robbery of a McDonald’s restaurant on the far south side of Chicago where the victims were security guards. Andrew Wilson, having been arrested and charged with the unrelated murders of two Chicago police officers, confided to his lawyers that he had indeed committed the crime of which Logan had been convicted. However, his lawyers were bound by attorney–client privilege, during Wilson’s lifetime, not to reveal what he had told them in confidence. Wilson died of natural causes in prison on November 19, 2007, and his attorneys were then able to release a notarized affidavit describing Wilson’s confession to them. Logan was released in September 2008, more than 26 years after he was arrested for a murder he did not commit. He subsequently received a certificate of innocence, and was awarded $199,000 in state compensation. In January 2013, the City of Chicago agreed to pay Logan $10.25 million to settle a federal wrongful conviction lawsuit. | | | | |
| Feb 24, 1982 | Charles Fain | Murder | Nampa, Idaho | Death by lethal injecion | 18 years | Yes |
| Feb 24, 1982 | Charles Fain | 9-year-old Daralyn Johnson was kidnapped, raped, and murdered while on her way to school. Charles Fain, who lived a block away from the victim, was convicted of the crime. Expert witnesses testified that pubic hair found on the body and a footprint found nearby "could have been" Fain's, and two prison inmates testified that he had confessed to the crime. DNA testing on the pubic hairs exonerated Fain, whose conviction was overturned in 2001, and David Dalrymple was later charged with the murder in 2022. | | | | |
| Mar 5, 1982 | Victor Rosario | Murder and arson | Lowell, Massachusetts | Life imprisonment | 35 years | Yes |
| Mar 5, 1982 | Victor Rosario | A building fire killed eight people, including three adults and five children. Although evidence suggested the fire was accidental, prosecutors believed Rosario and his brothers set the building on fire with Molotov cocktails as revenge for a drug deal. Rosario's Attorney stated he was trying to rescue people from the fire. Rosario's brothers were not tried because he refused to testify against them. Rosario signed a confession believing it would let him go, not fully understanding it due to English not being his first language. In 2014 a court vacated his conviction and in 2019 Rosario filed a lawsuit against the city. | | | | |
| Jun 1982 | Earl Washington Jr. | Murder and rape | Culpeper, Virginia | Death by electrocution | 17 years | Yes |
| Jun 1982 | Earl Washington Jr. | Washington was convicted of the murder of Rebecca Lynn Williams solely on the basis of coerced confessions during which he seemed to have little knowledge of the crime, the victim's appearance, or the location of the crime. Washington, a farmworker who has an intellectual disability, was exonerated in 2000 by DNA tests. | | | | |
| Jul 12, 1982 | Walter Forbes | Murder and arson | Jackson, Michigan | Life imprisonment | 37 years | Yes |
| Jul 12, 1982 | Walter Forbes | On July 12, 1982, a man died in a fire that was set in Jackson, Michigan. Dennis Hall was killed in an apparent arson at his apartment. Prior to his death, he was involved in an altercation at a bar which was broken up by college student Walter Forbes. The day after the bar fight, Hall shot Forbes requiring a few months to recover. As Hall and Forbes had been involved in two recent altercations, police arrested Forbes for Hall's death. Forbes would be convicted in court for the murder and arson in May 1983 and he was sentenced to life in prison for first degree murder. In 2017, a witness who had claimed she had seen Forbes and two others burn down the apartment recanted her statement. She claimed to a judge in 2020 that she had been threatened to do so by two men from her neighborhood who warned they would harm her and her family if she failed to testify against the three. Of them, only Forbes had been convicted due to discrepancies in her testimony. In addition to other evidence being uncovered, Forbes' conviction was overturned and he was freed in November 2020. It is now believed that the owner of the apartment, David Jones, was behind the arson as part of an insurance fraud scheme. Jones received a significant payout for the arson that damaged the building and killed Hall. Eight years later, Jones would be convicted of a different insurance fraud scheme involving arson where another person died. Two people confessed to conspiracy in that arson and testified against Jones in court. | | | | |
| Jul 17, 1982 | Marvin Anderson | Rape | Hanover County, Virginia | Life imprisonment | 15 years | Yes |
| Jul 17, 1982 | Marvin Anderson | A woman who stopped to help an injured bicyclist was instead attacked and dragged into the woods. During the rape, the black perpetrator told the victim that she reminded him of his white girlfriend. Based on this, Anderson, a local black man with a white girlfriend, was arrested. He was sentenced to life in prison, and despite a man named John Otis Lincoln confessing to the rape in 1988, his conviction was not vacated. He was released on parole in 1997. In 2001, it was discovered that the criminalist who worked on the case had saved the cotton swab used, against agency policy. When tested, it confirmed that Anderson was not the rapist. Governor Mark Warner pardoned him in 2002. | | | | |
| Oct 21, 1982 | Johnny Briscoe | Rape and robbery | St. Louis, Missouri | 45 years | 23 years | Yes |
| Oct 21, 1982 | Johnny Briscoe | Briscoe was tried for a 1982 rape and robbery. After the rape, the perpetrator smoked a cigarette, leaving the butt behind. While at the crime scene, the victim asked the perpetrator for his name. He told her his name was John Briscoe. Briscoe's photo was shown to the victim. A week later, she picked him out of a lineup in which he was the only one wearing a prison jumpsuit; the other men were wearing civilian clothing. Briscoe was convicted on the basis of a cross-racial eyewitness identification and hair analysis of hairs found at the crime scene, both of which are known to have a high degree of unreliability. In 2004, the cigarette butt was found from the crime scene matching another man named Larry Smith. Prior to the identification of Smith via DNA, Briscoe and Smith were serving time together in the same prison. Briscoe had heard rumors that Smith was the perpetrator and confronted him about it. Smith denied that he was involved. It is unknown why Smith used Briscoe's name during the crime, although he may have done it in order to frame Briscoe. | | | | |
| Feb 25, 1983 | Rolando Cruz and Alejandro Hernandez | Murder of Jeanine Nicarico | Naperville, Illinois | Death (Hernandez: commuted to 80 years) | 8 years | Yes |
| Feb 25, 1983 | Rolando Cruz and Alejandro Hernandez | 10-year-old Jeanine Nicarico was abducted by an intruder while home alone with influenza on February 25, 1983. Two days later her raped and beaten body was found in a wooded area near her home. Two Latino gang members, Rolando Cruz and Alejandro Hernandez, both separately made up details about the murder in an attempt to claim a monetary reward for information, but when their stories were disproven they soon became suspects and were convicted in 1987. Police allegedly added details of the crime that had not been made public to the men's confessions after the fact in order to make them more authentic. During the trial, serial killer Brian Dugan, on trial at the same time, offered to confess to Jeanine Nicarico's murder as part of a plea agreement but was turned down; this information was not given to the defense. Cruz and Hernandez were both given new trials in 1989 due to prosecutorial misconduct but were both convicted. Cruz was sent back to death row and Hernandez had his sentence reduced to 80 years. In 1994, DNA testing exonerated both men and proved that Dugan committed the murder. The following year, Cruz was acquitted at his third trial and the State's Attorney dismissed the charges against Hernandez. Brian Dugan later pleaded guilty to the murder of Jeanine Nicarico. | | | | |
| Aug 9, 1983 | Willie Earl Green | Murder | Los Angeles, California | Life imprisonment | 25 years | Yes |
| Aug 9, 1983 | Willie Earl Green | Denise Walker was killed during a robbery at the home of her boyfriend, Willie Finley. One burglar struck Finley on the head as he was returning from a store, and then brought him into the house where he ordered Walker to let in a second burglar. Walker's mother told police that Willie Green had robbed Denise a year earlier. Finley identified Green in a lineup and he was convicted. Green sought help from Centurion Ministries, a New Jersey-based wrongful conviction advocacy group. In 2004, during their reinvestigation, Finley recanted his testimony. He said that he was high on crack at the time of the attack and that his eyesight had been impaired by the blow to the head. He told investigators that he did not identify Green until police suggested Green as the attacker and told him of the earlier robbery. Based on Finley's recantation, his conviction was vacated in March 2008, and prosecutors decided not to retry him. | | | | |
| August 19, 1983 | Robert DuBoise | Murder and rape | Tampa, Florida | Death (commuted to life imprisonment) | 37 years | Yes |
| August 19, 1983 | Robert DuBoise | DuBoise was sentenced to death for the rape and murder of Barbara Grams, later resentenced to life imprisonment in 1988. He was linked to the crime by bite mark evidence and by a jailhouse informant who said that he had confessed to murdering Grams alongside his brother and their friend (neither of these men were charged). In 2020, DNA testing by the Innocence Project revealed that Grams was killed by Amos Robinson and Abron Scott. DuBoise's conviction was subsequently vacated and he was released. | | | | |
| Sep 13, 1983 | Juan Roberto Melendez-Colon | Murder | Auburndale, Florida | Death by electrocution | 17 years | Yes |
| Sep 13, 1983 | Juan Roberto Melendez-Colon | Melendez had an alibi and was convicted of the murder of Delbert Baker largely on testimony of David Falcon, who had a longstanding grudge against Melendez. Witnesses said Falcon had threatened to kill Melendez at some point prior to Melendez allegedly confessing to him. His appeal was denied three times when defense lawyers discovered a taped confession made by Vernon James. In light of the new evidence, Justice Barbara Fleischer determined that Melendez was entitled to a new trial. The state of Florida declined to prosecute a second time since the key witness at the original trial, David Falcon, was now dead and another witness for the prosecution had since recanted his testimony. | | | | |
| Sep 23, 1983 | Henry McCollum and Leon Brown | Murder and rape | Red Springs, North Carolina | Death (commuted to life imprisonment; Brown) | 31 years | Yes |
| Sep 23, 1983 | Henry McCollum and Leon Brown | McCollum and Brown were 19 and 15-year-old half-brothers, respectively, when they were arrested for the rape and murder of 11-year-old Sabrina Buie. Both half-brothers had intellectual disabilities, which made them susceptible to manipulation during their police interrogations. Red Springs and Robeson County police and interrogators convinced McCollum and Brown to waive their Miranda rights and sign inconsistent and contradictory confessions that implicated them in the murder, despite the evidence suggesting that Roscoe Artis, a serial rapist and possible serial killer in the area, had committed Buie's murder as he had committed several other similar crimes against at least two other women. In addition, Brown signed his confession in block letters rather than a signature because he was nearly illiterate and could not read his confession. In October 1984, both McCollum and Brown were sentenced to death, with Brown becoming the youngest person on North Carolina's death row. U.S. Supreme Court Justice Antonin Scalia used McCollum's case to justify the existence of the death penalty. After appealing, both death sentences were overturned in 1988, and the two had retrials in 1991. McCollum was again convicted of rape and murder and re-sentenced to death, while Brown was only convicted of rape and sentenced to life imprisonment. The two remained in prison/on death row for a total of 31 years before DNA testing confirmed that neither McCollum's DNA nor Brown's were found at the crime scene. However, because technology could not provide a positive match at the time, the two were held in prison until the North Carolina Innocence Inquiry Commission looked into their case and concluded that the physical evidence matched Roscoe Artis. McCollum and Brown were exonerated in September 2014, with McCollum being the longest-serving death row inmate in North Carolina history. The two were formally pardoned in 2015, enabling them to pursue compensation for their wrongful imprisonment. After multiple state and federal lawsuits, a federal court cumulatively awarded McCollum and Brown with $75 million, the largest award for a wrongful conviction in United States history. Artis died in prison in 2020 while serving a life sentence for a separate murder. | | | | |
| Nov 1983 | John Gordon Purvis | Murder | Fort Lauderdale, Florida | Life imprisonment | 10 years | Yes |
| Nov 1983 | John Gordon Purvis | Police received a tip that a man named Robert Wayne Beckett Sr. may have been involved in the murder of Susan Hamwi. Eventually a new set of detectives investigated Beckett, who admitted to the murder for hire on the instruction of Paul Hamwi, her ex-husband. He named Paul Serio as an accomplice. Beckett received immunity for his testimony, while Paul Hawmi and Paul Serio were both convicted of first degree murder and sentenced to life in prison. | | | | |
| 1983 | Mary Ann and Joe Elizondo | Child sexual abuse* | Jefferson, Texas | 35 years | 7–13 years | Yes |
| 1983 | Mary Ann and Joe Elizondo | In 1983, 10-year-old Robert Bienvenue and 8-year-old Richard told police that they had been sexually abused by their mother, Mary Ann Elizondo, and stepfather, Joe Elizondo. At the time, the boys were in the custody of their father and only spent weekends with their mother. Both Mary Ann and Joe were arrested and charged with sexual abuse, and in 1984, Joe was sentenced to life in prison, while Mary Ann was sentenced to 35 years in prison. After Mary Ann was released on parole in 1991, she was jailed for another six months for refusing to admit to sexually abusing her sons. All the while, Robert's father told him that Mary Ann simply abandoned him. But on his 17th birthday, Robert discovered a letter from his mother and learned for the first time that she and Joe were in prison, prompting him to reveal to the authorities that his father forced him to falsely accuse his mother of sexual abuse in retaliation for Mary Ann marrying Joe. A court granted Joe a new trial, and in 1997, prosecutors dismissed the case. In 2005, an appeals court vacated Mary Ann's conviction. | | | | |
| 1983 | Maurice Hastings | Murder and rape | Inglewood, California | Life imprisonment | 38 years | Yes |
| 1983 | Maurice Hastings | Hastings was charged with the rape and murder of Roberta Wydermyer. Despite DNA evidence being recovered from semen, the DA's office denied the request to have it DNA tested. In 2022 it was tested and identified as belonging to Kenneth Packnett, who died in prison in 2020 after having been convicted of armed kidnapping and rape. Hastings was released in October 2022, and he was declared "factually innocent" by a judge in March 2023. | | | | |
| 1983–1984 | Anthony Capozzi | Rape, sodomy, sexual abuse | Buffalo, New York | 11–35 years | 21 years | Yes |
| 1983–1984 | Anthony Capozzi | Capozzi spent 21 years in prison maintaining his innocence when in 2006, a woman was killed along a bike path in a Buffalo suburb. Investigators noticed similarities to a number of other rapes and murders in the area and believed they were committed by one individual. DNA testing implicated Altemio Sanchez, who eventually pleaded guilty to the 2006 murder and two others. At least eight crimes were eventually linked to Sanchez via DNA analysis. During the investigation, a detective noticed that one of Capozzi's alleged victims testified that she saw her rapist driving several days later and she copied down his license plate information. When the police initially investigated the tip, they found the owner of the vehicle, but he had an alibi. He was reinterviewed in 2006 and admitted that he had lent the car to his nephew, Altemio Sanchez, that day. Authorities subpoenaed the hospital where the rape victims were initially treated for evidence from the rape kits. It was believed that the evidence had been lost or destroyed, but eventually it was found and tested, excluding Capozzi and implicating Sanchez. | | | | |
| 1984 | Bernard Baran | Child sexual abuse* | Pittsfield, Massachusetts | Life imprisonment | 21 years | Yes |
| 1984 | Bernard Baran | Baran's conviction is cited as an example of the day-care sex-abuse hysteria of the 1980s and 1990s as well as a case of homophobia. The Baran case is the subject of the documentary film Freeing Bernie Baran. | | | | |
| 1984 | Alfred Chestnut, Ransom Watkins, and Andrew Stewart Jr. | Murder, robbery, illegal use of a weapon | Baltimore, Maryland | Life imprisonment | 36 years | Yes |
| 1984 | Leroy Orange | Murder | Chicago, Illinois | Death by lethal injection | 19 years | Yes |
| 1984 | Leroy Orange | Leroy Orange was arrested along with his half-brother Leonard Kidd. He was convicted of killing Ricardo Pedro, Michelle Jointer, his ex-girlfriend Renee Coleman, and her 10-year-old son, Tony, on the basis of a confession allegedly obtained through torture methods such as beating, suffocation, and electroshock. He was pardoned in 2006. Kidd's death sentence was commuted to life in prison. He maintains his innocence and contends that his confession was elicited through torture as well. At his trial, however, he had admitted his guilt, but said he acted alone. | | | | |
| 1984 | Kirk Bloodsworth | Murder and rape | Baltimore, Maryland | Death (commuted to life imprisonment) | 8 years | Yes |
| 1984 | Kirk Bloodsworth | On July 25, 1984, 9-year-old Dawn Hamilton was found dead in a wooded area. She had been beaten with a rock, sexually assaulted, and strangled. Kirk Bloodsworth was convicted on March 8, 1985, of sexual assault, rape, and first-degree premeditated murder. A Baltimore County judge sentenced Bloodsworth to death. He was exonerated almost nine years later after DNA testing excluded him. Bloodsworth became the first person in the U.S. exonerated with DNA evidence. The Innocence Project established the Kirk Bloodsworth Post-Conviction DNA Testing Program, a program that helps states defray the costs of post-conviction DNA testing. | | | | |
| 1984 | Darryl Hunt | Murder | Winston-Salem, North Carolina | Life in prison | 19.5 years | Yes |
| 1984 | Darryl Hunt | Hunt was convicted of the murder of Deborah Sykes on the basis of eyewitness testimony. He was later cleared by DNA testing, and another man went on to plead guilty to the crime. | | | | |
| Jan 3, 1984 | Thomas Haynesworth | Rape | Richmond, Virginia | 84 years | 27 years | Yes |
| Jan 3, 1984 | Thomas Haynesworth | Haynesworth was arrested at the age of 18 in 1984 after a woman identified him as her attacker. He was convicted of a series of violent rapes in Richmond, Virginia, now believed to have been committed by a neighbor who resembled Haynesworth. In 2009, new state laws and procedures allowed for DNA testing, which was not available in the 1980s, and semen collected from the first attack implicated the neighbor. The case, which The Washington Post called "one of the state's most extraordinary legal cases", utilized DNA testing and new state laws that allowed possibly innocent convicts to present new evidence. | | | | |
| July 1984 | Ronald Cotton | Rape and burglary | Alamance County, North Carolina | Life imprisonment | 10 years | Yes |
| July 1984 | Ronald Cotton | Cotton was convicted of raping two women in their apartments in 1984. Both victims identified him as their assailant and rubber from his shoes was said to be consistent with rubber from the assailant's footprints. Ten years into his life sentence he was cleared by DNA testing which implicated another prisoner. | | | | |
| Nov 3, 1984 | Robert Lee Stinson | Murder, rape | Milwaukee | Life imprisonment | 23 years | Yes |
| Nov 3, 1984 | Robert Lee Stinson | Stinson was convicted of the rape and murder of his neighbour Ione Cychosz based on the testimony of forensic odontologists Lowell Johnson and Ray Rawson, who both matched a bite mark on the victim's body to Stinson. In 2005 DNA testing requested by the Innocence Project exonerated Stinson and identified another man named Moses Price as the killer. Stinson was released in 2009. | | | | |
| Dec 6, 1984 | John Thompson | Murder and carjacking | New Orleans, Louisiana | Death (commuted to life imprisonment) | 18 years | Yes |
| Feb 5, 1985 | Beatrice Six: Thomas Winslow, Joseph White, Ada JoAnn Taylor, Kathy Gonzalez, James Dean, and Debra Shelden | Murder, rape, and accessory to murder | Beatrice, Nebraska | Varies | 4–23 years | Yes |
| Feb 5, 1985 | Beatrice Six: Thomas Winslow, Joseph White, Ada JoAnn Taylor, Kathy Gonzalez, James Dean, and Debra Shelden | Thomas Winslow, Joseph White, Ada JoAnn Taylor, Kathy Gonzalez, James Dean, and Debra Shelden were found guilty of the 1985 rape and murder of Helen Wilson. They were pardoned in 2008 after DNA evidence from the crime scene identified Bruce Allen Smith as the true culprit. Smith died in 1992. | | | | |
| Feb 25, 1985 | Anthony Ray Hinton | Murder and armed robbery | Birmingham, Alabama | Death by electrocution | 29 years | Yes |
| Feb 25, 1985 | Anthony Ray Hinton | Hinton was sentenced to death in 1985 for armed robbery and the murders of John Davidson and Thomas Wayne Vason, two fast food managers in Birmingham. The US Supreme Court ruled in 2014 that his defense lawyer had been deficient. Prosecutors admitted that the bullets found at the scene did not match Hinton's gun; Hinton's conviction was thrown out by a circuit court judge in April 2015 and he was freed. | | | | |
| Mar 1985 | Dennis Perry | Murder | Camden County, Georgia | Life imprisonment | 19 years | Yes |
| Mar 1985 | Dennis Perry | Harold and Thelma Swain were killed after an invasion at their church during a bible study session. Perry was convicted based on witness testimony by an ex-girlfriend's mother who later received a Crimestoppers reward. Perry was also believed to resemble a composite sketch made based on the information of several women who were at the church that night. Perry took a post-conviction deal to avoid the death penalty which restricted his ability to appeal. After coverage by the podcast Undisclosed and The Atlanta Journal-Constitution a potential alternate suspect was identified and DNA testing was pursued by the Georgia Innocence Project. DNA evidence from hairs on glasses left at the scene were tested, and did not match Perry, but were consistent with the alternate suspect. | | | | |
| Mar 1985 | Margaret Earle | Murder | Plymouth, Massachusetts | Life imprisonment | 5 years | Yes |
| Mar 1985 | Margaret Earle | In March 1985, Margaret Earle left her 21-month-old daughter Rachelle in the care of her boyfriend, Michael Burnham, to celebrate her 21st birthday with a friend. The next morning, Margaret found her daughter ill but was unable to reach her doctor. While Margaret went to a pharmacy, the paramedics rushed Rachelle to the hospital, where she was pronounced dead. Rachelle's autopsy revealed significant injuries, including fractured ribs and internal bleeding. However, both Margaret and Michael denied any wrongdoing, and the case went cold. Years later, Michael called 911 and confessed to murdering Rachelle in anger over having to babysit a child. Police accused Margaret of failing to promptly seek medical treatment for Rachelle, and both Michael and Margaret were charged with first-degree murder and sentenced to life in prison. But after Margaret's appellate lawyer uncovered evidence of Margaret's phone calls to the doctor, the Massachusetts Supreme Judicial Court reversed Margaret's conviction. Prosecutors subsequently dismissed the case. | | | | |
| Mar 9, 1985 | David Lee Gavitt | Murder and arson* | Ionia, Michigan | Life imprisonment | 26 years | Yes |
| Mar 9, 1985 | David Lee Gavitt | On March 9, 1985, a fire broke out at the Gavitt family home. David Lee Gavitt managed to escape the house, but his wife Angela and their daughters Tracy and Katrina were all killed. Arson investigators claimed that irregular circular burn marks on the floor indicated the fire was deliberately started using an accelerant. David Gavitt was accused of starting the fire, although no motive as to why he would have done so was presented, and he was convicted in 1986. He was freed on appeal in 2012 after advances in science revealed that the evidence was consistent with an accidental fire. | | | | |
| 1985 and earlier | Margaret Michaels | Child sexual abuse* | Maplewood, New Jersey | 47 years | 5 years | Yes |
| 1985 and earlier | Margaret Michaels | Michaels, the owner of the Wee Care daycare centre, was accused of molesting children under her care. 51 children made accusations such as that Michaels forced them to lick peanut butter off of her genitals, that she penetrated their rectums and vaginas with knives, forks and other objects, that she forced them to eat cakes made from human excrement and that she made them play duck, duck, goose while naked. She was convicted of 115 sexual offences against 20 children. Her conviction was overturned after five years after a court ruled that the children's testimonies were unreliable and had been manipulated by the interviewers. | | | | |
| Jul 29, 1985 | Steven Avery | Rape | Two Rivers, Wisconsin | 32 years | 18 years | Yes |
| Jul 29, 1985 | Steven Avery | 36-year-old Penny Ann Beerntsen was jogging along Lake Michigan when she was grabbed from behind, dragged into a wooded area and raped. Despite having alibis, Avery was convicted on the basis of a visual identification by the victim and visual hair analysis. In April 2002, DNA testing of 13 pubic hairs recovered from Beerntsen excluded Avery. The DNA matched a man named Gregory Allen, who bore a striking resemblance to Avery. Avery was exonerated and released. As a result of the case, Wisconsin made changes to their eyewitness protocol. Avery also filed a civil suit for wrongful conviction against Manitowoc County, Wisconsin, and some county officials, seeking $36 million in damages. Avery settled the lawsuit for $400,000, used for his defense of the 2005 murder of Teresa Halbach, for which he and nephew Brendan Dassey were convicted and sentenced to life in prison. On December 18, 2015, Netflix released a documentary that covers both of Avery's convictions. This 10-episode documentary titled Making a Murderer was filmed over 10 years. Allen was never charged in the Beerntsen case because the statute of limitations has expired. | | | | |
| Oct 20, 1985 | Willie Stuckey, David McCallum | Murder of Nathan Blenner | Queens, New York | 25 years to life | 28 years | Yes (Stuckey posthumously) |
| Oct 20, 1985 | Willie Stuckey, David McCallum | Stuckey and McCallum confessed to the kidnapping and murder of Nathan Blenner. They recanted their confessions and maintained that they were beaten by the police, but were convicted and sentenced to 25 years to life. Stuckey died in prison in 2001. Stuckey and McCallum's convictions were overturned by the Kings County Conviction Integrity Unit in 2014 after unknown DNA was found at the crime scene; their investigation found that there was no evidence against either man except for their confessions, which were inconsistent and at odds with forensic evidence. | | | | |
| Nov 28, 1985 | Michael Roy Toney | Murder | Lake Worth, Texas | Death | 10 years | Yes |
| Nov 28, 1985 | Michael Roy Toney | Three members of the Blount family were killed when a bomb was left in a suitcase outside their house. Michael Toney was arrested eight years later when a jailhouse informant claimed he had confessed to the bombing. The informant had recanted by the time of trial, claiming he and Toney had concocted the confession together to get him out of prison, but Toney was convicted in 1999 after two witnesses testified that they had seen him placing the bomb outside the Blount family home. Toney's conviction was overturned ten years after the trial after a court found that the prosecution had withheld evidence that the two witnesses had given inconsistent stories and had been fed information by the police. | | | | |
| Dec 1, 1985 | Ralph "Ricky" Birch and Shawn Henning | Murder | New Milford, Connecticut | 55 years | 30 years | Yes |
| Dec 1, 1985 | Ralph "Ricky" Birch and Shawn Henning | Birch and Henning were charged with killing 65-year-old Everett Carr, who was stabbed 27 times at his home. There was no forensic evidence directly linking the two to the crime, but they were convicted based on the testimony of forensics expert Henry Lee, who said a towel had tested positive for blood. However, tests conducted after the trial found the substance was not blood, and a judge found there was no evidence Lee had actually conducted any testing on the towel. The murder convictions were vacated in 2020. | | | | |
| 1985 | Tim Cole | Rape | Lubbock, Texas | 25 years | 14 years (died in prison) | Yes |
| 1985 | Tim Cole | Cole was convicted of rape on basis of a visual identification by the victim, Michele Mallin, his classmate. Among other things, Mallin told police that the rapist smoked during the rape. However, Cole never smoked because of his severe asthma. He died in prison on December 2, 1999, from an asthma attack. Another man, Jerry Wayne Johnson, confessed to the rape in 2007. DNA evidence later confirmed that the rape was committed by Johnson. Cole was posthumously exonerated; it was the first posthumous DNA exoneration in the history of the state of Texas. Johnson confirmed in court that he was the rapist and asked the victim and Cole's family to forgive him. "It's been on my heart to express my sincerest sorrow and regret and ask to be forgiven," said Johnson, who is serving life in prison for two other 1985 rapes. However, Johnson cannot be charged in the Mallin case because the statute of limitations has expired. | | | | |
| Apr 13, 1986 | Johnny Lee Wilson | Murder | Aurora, Missouri | Life imprisonment | 8 years | Yes |
| Apr 13, 1986 | Johnny Lee Wilson | In 1995, Wilson was pardoned by the governor of Missouri, Mel Carnahan. He had been sentenced to life in prison without parole for the 1986 murder of an elderly woman, seventy-nine-year-old Pauline Martz. Wilson confessed to the crime, but Carnahan concluded in his investigation that Wilson, an intellectually disabled twenty-year-old, was coerced by the authorities. Carnahan also concluded that there was no evidence linking Wilson to the murder. | | | | |
| Jul 14, 1986 | Santiago Ventura Morales | Murder | Sandy, Oregon | Life imprisonment | 5 years | Yes |
| Jul 14, 1986 | Santiago Ventura Morales | Morales was convicted of the murder of Ramiro Lopez Fidel in 1986. At trial, he was provided a Spanish interpreter, though his native language is Mixtec. He maintained his innocence and several jurors later had second thoughts about the conviction and began advocating that he be released from prison. The lack of an appropriate interpreter and other deficiencies in his trial led to his conviction being overturned as well as evidence that pointed to another person. In 1995, the state of Oregon passed a law that requires testing and certification of court interpreters as a result of the Morales case. | | | | |
| Aug 13, 1986 | Michael Morton | Murder | Williamson County, Texas | Life imprisonment | 25 years | Yes |
| Aug 13, 1986 | Michael Morton | Morton was convicted of his wife Christine Morton's murder in 1987. He was exonerated in 2011 after DNA tests linked another man, Mark Alan Norwood, to the murder. Norwood was subsequently convicted of Christine's murder. He also is a suspect in the 1988 murder of Debra Baker in her Austin home. Both women were beaten to death in their beds. The prosecutor in the case was charged with contempt after it was discovered that he withheld evidence from the defense team. He gave up his law license and served five days in jail as part of a plea bargain. | | | | |
| Sep 21, 1986 | John Galvan, Arthur Almendarez, Francisco Nanez | Murder and arson | Chicago, Illinois | Life imprisonment | 35 years | Yes |
| Sep 21, 1986 | John Galvan, Arthur Almendarez, Francisco Nanez | Brothers Guadalupe and Julio Martinez were killed in an arson attack at their apartment in September 1986. Their siblings believed the attack was retaliation for their involvement with the Latin Kings gang. Police suspected teenagers John Galvan, Francisco Nanez, and Michael Almendarez, who had allegedly been seen in the area shortly before the fire, although witnesses attested that Galvan had been at home for at least an hour by this time. Michael Almendarez was allegedly intimidated by the police until he accused Galvan and Nanez of starting the fire, which he would later testify was a lie. Galvan and Nanez confessed to starting the fire with help from Almendarez's brother Arthur, who also confessed; Galvan and Arthur Almendarez later retracted their confessions, accusing police of torturing them, and Nanez claimed he had been tricked into confessing while drunk. All three were convicted and sentenced to life without parole. 21 years into his sentence, Galvan saw an episode of MythBusters during which the presenters proved that it was impossible to ignite a pool of gasoline by throwing a lit cigarette into it - which Galvan and Nanez had claimed was how they lit the fire. Galvan, Nanez, and Almendarez then appealed their convictions on the grounds that their confessions, which constituted the only evidence against them, were scientifically impossible. Their initial motions for a new trial and the suppression of their confessions were denied, but their convictions were eventually vacated and the charges against them dismissed in 2022. | | | | |
| Sep 27, 1986 | Douglas DiLosa | Murder | Kenner, Louisiana | Life imprisonment | 14 years | Yes |
| Sep 27, 1986 | Douglas DiLosa | In September 1986, police were called to the DiLosa home to find Douglas and Glinda DiLosa tied up by intruders. Glinda DiLosa had been strangled to death. Police claimed not to have found any sign of forced entry and accused Douglas DiLosa of killing his wife for her life insurance policy. After his conviction, DiLosa obtained a police report revealing evidence withheld by the prosecution at his trial, which included hair belonging to a black man (DiLosa was white, but the men he accused of the murder were black) found on the rope used to strangle Glinda and unidentified fingerprints being found at the crime scene. DiLosa was released pending a retrial in 2001 and charges were dismissed two years later. | | | | |
| Nov 1, 1986 | Walter McMillian | Murder | Monroeville, Alabama | Death by electrocution | Four years | Yes |
| Nov 1, 1986 | Walter McMillian | Ronda Morrison, an 18-year-old white woman, was shot to death at a dry-cleaners in 1986. Walter McMillian, a black man, was arrested and held for two years without being charged. McMillian was eventually charged in 1988 despite six witnesses placing him at a fish fry during the murder. Informant Ralph Myers claimed to have witnessed McMillian commit the murder, and two other witnesses placed McMillian's low-rider truck at the scene (although his truck was not converted to a low-rider until after the murder). After six years on death row (including two years pre-trial detention), his lawyer Bryan Stevenson presented evidence withheld by the prosecution, including an interrogation tape in which Myers complained that he was being forced to implicate McMillian. The two witnesses who claimed to have seen McMillian's truck also recanted their testimony. McMillian was granted a new trial, and the charges were dropped later that year. | | | | |
| Nov 4, 1986 | Barry Gibbs | Murder | Brooklyn | 20 years to life | 17 years | Yes |
| Nov 4, 1986 | Barry Gibbs | Barry Gibbs was convicted of murdering Virginia Robertson, a woman whose body was dumped off the Belt Parkway in November 1986. He was identified by an eyewitness who had seen a man dragging Robertson's body out of his car. In 2005, the detective in charge of the case, Louis Eppolito, was exposed as a mole for the Lucchese crime family who had been involved in numerous criminal acts. During the ensuing investigation, the original witness told investigators that Gibbs was not the man he saw, accusing Eppolito of forcing him to identify Gibbs by threatening his family. Gibbs' conviction was overturned and he was released in September. | | | | |
| Jan 22 and Feb 16, 1987 | Glen Woodall | Sexual assault, sexual abuse, kidnapping, robbery | Barboursville, West Virginia | Life imprisonment | 5 years | Yes |
| Jan 22 and Feb 16, 1987 | Glen Woodall | Two victims in two separate incidents were abducted, raped, and robbed. The assailant wore a ski mask, but both victims noted a few characteristics, such as the perpetrator was uncircumcised. Woodall was convicted on circumstantial evidence, including testimony that he shared the same blood type, similar body and beard hair, voice identification, and a partial visual identification by victim two, and the fact that Woodall was uncircumcised. Woodall was granted DNA testing in 1988 on semen samples recovered from the victims—the first ever admitted as evidence at the state level in the United States—which excluded Woodall, and the conviction was thrown out. Woodall was the first person to be exonerated after being convicted due to testimony by lab technician Fred Zain. Woodall's defense team conducted its own tests on the evidence, which determined that Zain had used flawed blood-typing methods in tying the semen to Woodall. It further appeared that Zain had initially determined a piece of hair was unidentifiable pubic hair, but later changed his identification to hair from Woodall's beard. Woodall subsequently sued the state for false imprisonment and won a $1 million settlement. At the request of the state police, Kanawha County Prosecutor William Forbes began a criminal investigation. Forbes was so disturbed by what he found that he asked the Supreme Court of Appeals of West Virginia to appoint a special judge and a panel of lawyers and scientists to investigate the serology department. On November 4, 1993, Senior Circuit Court Judge James Holliday issued a report finding that Zain had engaged in a staggering litany of misconduct and outright fraud. According to the report, Zain had misstated evidence, falsified lab results and reported scientifically implausible results that may have resulted in as many as 134 people being wrongfully convicted. Holliday found that Zain's misconduct was so egregious that any testimony offered by Zain should be presumed as prima facie "invalid, unreliable, and inadmissible". It also found serious deficiencies in the serology division's quality-control procedures. The Supreme Court unanimously accepted Holliday's report on November 12, calling Zain's actions "egregious violations of the right of a defendant to a fair trial" and a "corruption of our legal system". West Virginia paid out a total of $6.5 million to settle lawsuits by people who had been wrongfully convicted due to Zain. | | | | |
| Feb 11, 1987 | Tim Masters | Murder | Fort Collins, Colorado | Life imprisonment | 9 years | Yes |
| Feb 11, 1987 | Tim Masters | Peggy Hettrick was murdered in 1987. Masters was a sophomore in high school at the time of the murder. He was convicted largely on the basis of graphic drawings by Masters portraying violent scenes. He was later eliminated via DNA testing. In 2008, special prosecutors assigned to the case agreed that critical information was not turned over to the original defense team. Rather, the DNA results pointed to Hettrick's sometime boyfriend. In 2008 a Colorado judge vacated Masters' conviction and ordered him released immediately. | | | | |
| Sep 1987 | Susie Mowbray | Murder* | Cameron, Texas | Life imprisonment | 9 years | Yes |
| Sep 1987 | Susie Mowbray | In September 1987, car dealer Bill Mowbray shot himself in his bed, while his wife, Susie Mowbray, was lying next to him. Despite the fact that Bill had been threatening to commit suicide for months over financial troubles, the police zeroed in on Susie as the culprit and charged her with first-degree murder. At her trial, detectives claimed that the blood spatter indicated that Susie shot her husband, and in June 1988, Susie was convicted and sentenced to life in prison. In 1996, Susie was granted a new trial after it was revealed that the prosecution suppressed a report from blood spatter expert Herbert MacDonnell, who concluded that the police's luminol staining procedure was unreliable and that no blood spatter was found on Susie's nightgown. The police even admitted at a hearing that there was no scientific support for their case. In January 1998, a jury acquitted Susie of the charges. | | | | |
| Oct 24, 1987 | Willie Grimes | Rape and kidnapping | Hickory, North Carolina | Life imprisonment | 24 years, 9 months, 23 days | Yes |
| Oct 24, 1987 | Willie Grimes | On October 24, 1987, around 9 p.m., a black man forced his way into the home of a white 69-year old widow in Hickory, North Carolina, brandishing a knife. He raped her on her couch, dragged her to her bedroom and raped her again before leaving through the back door, stealing some fruit from a bowl in the kitchen on his way out. Linda McDowell, a neighbor of the victim and sister of Grimes' ex-girlfriend, pointed the police to Willie Grimes, knowing of a $1,000 reward. During his trial, microscopic hair analysis was used to indicate him and the victim identified him as the perpetrator - after pointing to his attorney first. Eight friends who spent the evening with Grimes gave him an alibi and four other witnesses spoke to his "calm" character with no violent tendencies. Grimes himself pointed out that the victim never mentioned a significant scar on his chest and two missing fingertips. Grimes was convicted by a mostly white jury to life in prison for the rapes and 9 years for the kidnapping. In 2001, when post-conviction DNA testing was established in North Carolina, Grimes sought testing of the hair and was told the evidence was destroyed - although his lawyer had requested it to be preserved immediately after the conviction. In 2003, finger prints taken from fruit in the kitchen were matched to Albert Lindsey Turner who had been a suspect before the informant's call. In 2010, a petition was filed with the North Carolina Innocence Inquiry Commission and the case and new evidence were given to a tribunal of judges in 2012. The tribunal decided within 30 minutes to vacate Grimes convictions. In the retrial the DA apologized to Grimes instead of a closing argument and he was exonerated. He was awarded $6.2 million in damages in settlements with the city and state. | | | | |
| 1987 | Levon Jones | Murder | Duplin County, North Carolina | Death by lethal injection | 14 years | Yes |
| 1987 | Levon Jones | Jones was sentenced to death in 1993 for the murder of Leamon Grady. Lovely Lorden, the sole witness against Jones, admitted in an affidavit that she "was certain that Bo did not have anything to do with Mr. Grady's murder" and that she did not know what happened the night Grady was murdered. His conviction was overturned in 2006 and he was released. | | | | |
| Jan 22, 1988 | James Calvin Tillman | Rape | Hartford, Connecticut | 45 years | 16 years | Yes |
| Jan 22, 1988 | James Calvin Tillman | Accused and found guilty of rape, Tillman was released after DNA tests proved he was not the culprit. | | | | |
| June 22, 1988 | Anthony Michael Green | Rape and robbery | Cuyahoga County, Ohio | 20-50 years | 13 years | Yes |
| June 22, 1988 | Anthony Michael Green | Green was convicted of both rape and aggravated robbery at the Cleveland Clinic Inn, in which a Caucasian woman was attacked by an African American male, named "Tony". He had been linked to the crime through photos, forensic testing, and a singular washcloth, which led to his conviction of two-consecutive, ten-to twenty five year prison terms. In 1997, Green reached out to the Innocence Project, and was able to retest his legal battle with new DNA testing. On October 9, 2001, Greene was able to walk free after 13 years of incarceration. | | | | |
| Jul 12, 1988 | Walter Ogrod | Murder and rape | Philadelphia, Pennsylvania | Death by lethal injection | 23 years | Yes |
| Jul 12, 1988 | Walter Ogrod | Ogrod confessed to luring 4-year-old Barbara Horn into his basement and bludgeoning her to death after trying to molest her. He spent over two decades on death row before his conviction was vacated in 2020 due to DNA evidence which proved Ogrod was not the killer. | | | | |
| August 19, 1988 | Shawn Drumgold | Murder | Boston, Massachusetts | Life imprisonment | 14 years | Yes |
| August 19, 1988 | Shawn Drumgold | 12-year-old Tiffany Moore was killed when she was caught in the crossfire of a shootout between rival gangs. Shawn Drumgold was convicted after eyewitnesses placed him at the scene of the shootout with a gun in his hand. In 2003, two witnesses recanted and accused the police of forcing them to identify Drumgold, and it was revealed that the police had also intimidated witnesses who supported Drumgold's alibi. Drumgold's conviction was overturned and prosecutors chose not to pursue another trial. | | | | |
| Sep 7, 1988 | Martin Tankleff | Murder | Long Island, New York | Life imprisonment | 17 years | Yes |
| Sep 7, 1988 | Martin Tankleff | Martin Tankleff's parents, Seymour and Arlene Tankleff, were murdered while the 17-year-old Tankleff was sleeping in the home. He was convicted on the basis of a false confession given during an extended interrogation. His convictions were overturned in 2007 after his defense attorney presented an alternative scenario involving Seymour's business partner, to whom he owed money, and three former convicts, one of whom confessed to being the getaway driver. | | | | |
| Sep 10, 1988 | David Dowaliby | Murder of Jaclyn Dowaliby | Midlothian, Illinois | 45 years | One year | Yes |
| Sep 10, 1988 | David Dowaliby | Seven-year-old Jaclyn Dowaliby was abducted from her home during the night and strangled to death. Police charged her parents, David and Cynthia, with the crime, alleging that a witness had placed David Dowaliby at the scene where the body was dumped on the night of Jaclyn's abduction, and that there was evidence that the couple had staged a break-in at their home. Cynthia was acquitted by direction of the trial judge as there was no evidence against her, but David was convicted. He appealed, arguing that the trial judge should have directed his acquittal as well as his wife's, and it was revealed that the prosecution had withheld evidence that it was impossible for the witness to have recognised David (who he did not know) from 75 yards away in the dark. David's conviction was vacated just over a year after his trial. | | | | |
| Sep 22, 1988 | Virginia LeFever | Murder* | Newark, Ohio | Life in prison | 21 years | Yes |
| Sep 22, 1988 | Virginia LeFever | In September 1988, William LeFever, while in the middle of a divorce, died of an acute drug overdose. His wife, Virginia, found an empty bottle of antidepressants in their home and subsequently told police that he had committed suicide. However, the police accused Virginia of poisoning her husband and charged her with murder. In February 1990, Virginia was convicted and sentenced to life in prison. 20 years later, Virginia's lawyer discovered that the prosecution's key witness, toxicologist James Ferguson, lied about his credentials, prompting a court to reverse Virginia's conviction. In April 2011, the prosecution dismissed the case. | | | | |
| Oct 24, 1988 | Chris Ochoa and Richard Danzinger | Murder | Austin, Texas | Life imprisonment | 13 years | Yes |
| Oct 24, 1988 | Chris Ochoa and Richard Danzinger | In 1988, Nancy DePriest was raped and murdered at the Pizza Hut where she worked in Austin, Texas. A coworker, Chris Ochoa, pleaded guilty to the murder. His friend and coworker, Richard Danziger, was convicted of the rape. Ochoa confessed to the murder, as well as implicating Danziger in the rape. The only forensic evidence linking Danziger to the crime scene was a single pubic hair found in the restaurant, which was said to be consistent with his pubic hair type. Although semen evidence had been collected, a DNA analysis of only one gene was performed at the time; even though Ochoa had this gene, it was known also to be present in 10–16% of individuals. Both men received life sentences with no possibility of parole. Years later a man named Achim Marino (who was in prison serving his three-life sentences for robbery, rape and murder respectively) began writing letters from prison claiming he was the actual murderer in the Pizza Hut case and that Ocha and Danziger were innocent. He said that he had converted to Christianity while in prison and wanted to tell the truth to free Ochoa and Danziger from prison. The DNA from the crime scene was tested, and it matched that of Marino. The DNA of Ochoa and Danziger was excluded from matching that evidence. Ochoa later said that he was coerced by the police to confess and implicate his friend in the rape and murder. In 2001 Ochoa and Danziger were exonerated and released from prison after 12 years of incarceration. While in prison, Danziger had been severely beaten by other inmates in 1991 and suffered permanent brain damage. He requires all day medical care for the rest of his life. Marino was later convicted of the murder (he couldn't be charged with the rape due to the statute of limitations.) and was given an additional life sentence. | | | | |
| Nov 8, 1988 | Joseph Burrows | Murder | Kankakee, Illinois | Death by lethal injection | 6 years | Yes |
| Nov 8, 1988 | Joseph Burrows | William Dulan, an 88-year-old retired farmer, was found dead November 8, 1988. Several hours after the murder, a man named Chuck Gullion attempted to cash one of Dulan's checks at a local bank. Gullion was arrested along with 32-year-old Gayle Potter. Potter admitted to the killing, but implicated two others: Burrows and Ralph Frye, 22, an intellectually disabled friend of Burrows. No physical evidence linked either Burrows or Frye to the crime, and the two men had alibis. After a lengthy interrogation, Frye agreed to a plea deal in exchange for testifying against Burrows. Following Burrows' conviction, Frye recanted his testimony to news reporter Peter Rooney, claiming that police had coerced him in exchange for a lesser sentence. Burrows' lawyers discovered a letter written by Potter asking a friend to lie and say that she had seen Burrows drive her to the crime scene. Confronted with the letter, Potter admitted that she had falsely accused the men in part because she mistakenly believed that Burrows had burglarized her trailer. | | | | |
| Jan 1989 | Employees at the Little Rascals day care facility | Child sexual abuse* | Edenton, North Carolina | Varied, 7 years to life | Varied | Varied |
| Jan 1989 | Employees at the Little Rascals day care facility | Day-care sex-abuse hysteria: In January, 1989, allegations were made that Bob Kelly had sexually abused a child. A total of 90 children, after many therapy sessions (in some cases up to ten months' worth), also made allegations leading to accusations against dozens besides Kelly and charges against seven adults (Bob and Betsy Kelly, three workers at the day care, a worker at a local Head Start center and the son of a judge). The charges ultimately involved rape, sodomy, and fellatio, while other bizarre allegations were also made, including the murder of babies, torture, and being thrown into a school of sharks. During the trial, children were asked to testify about events that had occurred three years previously, with memories "refreshed" in therapy sessions, meetings with the prosecution and repeated discussions with their parents. While the alleged abuse was occurring, no parents noticed anything unusual about their children's behavior to indicate abuse or torture. The eight-month trial against Bob Kelly was the most expensive in North Carolina history, ending in conviction on 99 of 100 charges and twelve consecutive life sentences, though on May 2, 1995, all convictions were reversed in the Court of Appeals. | | | | |
| Apr 19, 1989 | Central Park Five: Yusef Salaam, Antron McCray, Raymond Santana, Kevin Richardson, and Korey Wise | Assault and rape | Manhattan, New York | Varied | Varied | Yes |
| Apr 19, 1989 | Central Park Five: Yusef Salaam, Antron McCray, Raymond Santana, Kevin Richardson, and Korey Wise | The five boys, who were between the ages of 14 and 16 at the time, were convicted of the assault and rape of Trisha Ellen Meili, who was jogging in Central Park. They were convicted and their convictions were upheld on appeal, though they asserted that their convictions were based on allegedly coerced confessions and allegedly faulty scientific evidence. The convictions were vacated in 2002 when Matias Reyes, a convicted rapist and murderer serving a life sentence for other crimes and whose DNA evidence confirmed his involvement in the rape, claimed after the statute of limitations had run that he had committed the crimes alone, a claim the Armstrong Report disagreed with. | | | | |
| Apr 11, 1989 | Sabrina Butler | Murder* | Mississippi | Death by lethal gas | 5 years | Yes |
| Apr 11, 1989 | Sabrina Butler | Sabrina was convicted of murder and child abuse after her unresponsive nine-month-old son, Walter Dean Butler, was rushed to the hospital. At retrial, one of Sabrina's neighbors corroborated her account of events and the medical examiner changed his opinion about Walter's cause of death, which he now believed occurred due to a renal condition. Sabrina was acquitted. No definitive cause of death was ever established for the death of Sabrina's son. Neither the jury at Sabrina's first retrial or her retrial were informed that she had previously lost custody of another child for abusing them. Sabrina's own attorney has stated that he "doesn't know what the truth is." Her co-counsel indicated that, at best, the case should have been prosecuted as manslaughter. | | | | |
| Aug 1989 | Jeffrey Scott Hornoff | Murder | Warwick, Rhode Island | Life imprisonment | 6 years | Yes |
| Aug 1989 | Jeffrey Scott Hornoff | Victoria Cushman was killed in 1989. Hornoff was a police detective who had an affair with the victim. He was arrested in 1994, and convicted by a jury of first degree murder in June 1996, despite what seemed a rock-solid alibi and no physical evidence linking him to the crime. In November 2002, Todd Barry confessed to the murder and was sentenced to 30 years in prison. | | | | |
| Jan 4, 1989 | Debbie Tucker Loveless and John Harvey Miller | Murder* | Emory, Texas | Life imprisonment | 4 years | Yes |
| Jan 4, 1989 | Debbie Tucker Loveless and John Harvey Miller | Loveless and Miller were convicted of murdering Loveless' 4-year-old daughter, April Renee Tucker, who died on the operating table after sustaining multiple lacerations, including a severed femoral artery. Loveless and Miller claimed that April had told them she had been attacked and mauled by dogs, but investigators rejected their theory, in large part because April's wound was a clean cut, lacking the jagged edges one would expect in a dog attack. On November 5, 1989, they were convicted and sentenced to life in prison. While working on their appeal, lawyers for Miller and Loveless found that April's emergency room and autopsy photos, which had not been turned over the defense prior to the trial, strongly supported the theory that April was attacked by dogs. Furthermore, a key piece of prosecution evidence was found to be flawed: while trying to save April's life, doctors had cut away some of the damaged skin with scalpels, causing the clean cuts that had been mistakenly attributed to abuse. Based on the prosecution's failure to disclose potentially exculpatory evidence, Loveless and Miller's convictions were overturned and they were granted a new trial. Loveless and Miller were released from prison on December 23, 1993; prosecutors elected not to re-try Loveless and Miller for the crime, and formally dismissed the charges against them on May 2, 1994. | | | | |
| Jul 1989 | Patricia Stallings | Murder* | Jefferson City, Missouri | Life imprisonment | 8 months | Yes |
| Jul 1989 | Patricia Stallings | In July 1989, Patricia Stallings took her sick newborn son Ryan to the hospital for treatment, where tests revealed ethylene glycol, the main ingredient in antifreeze, in his blood. Patricia was accused of poisoning Ryan and was quickly arrested. While in jail, she gave birth to a second child, who began exhibiting the same symptoms as Ryan despite having no contact with Patricia. He was diagnosed with Methylamalonic Acidemia (MMA), a rare genetic disorder that may have explained Ryan's symptoms. However, Patricia's lawyer decided to argue that Ryan simply died of natural causes, and in January 1991, Patricia was convicted of first degree murder and assault and sentenced to life in prison. But additional blood tests by biochemist William Sly revealed that Ryan did in fact die of MMA. Based on the new evidence, Patricia was granted a new trial, and in September 1991, the prosecution dismissed the case. | | | | |
| Jul 29, 1989 | Han Tak Lee | Murder and arson* | Monroe County, Pennsylvania | Life imprisonment | 24 years | Yes |
| Jul 29, 1989 | Han Tak Lee | In July 1989 a fire erupted at a building at a Christian retreat camp, killing 20-year-old Ji Yun Lee. Her father, Han Tak Lee, was arrested and charged with starting the fire. He was convicted and sentenced to life in prison. In 2014, a judge ruled that his conviction was based on since-discredited fire evidence, and the conviction was thrown out. | | | | |
| Dec 2, 1989 | Debra Milke | Murder | Phoenix, Arizona | Death | 23 years | Yes |
| Dec 2, 1989 | Debra Milke | Milke was accused of conspiring with two men, James Styers and Roger Scott, to kill her four-year-old son Christopher for his life insurance policy. Scott and Styers, who had carried out the abduction and murder, refused to testify against Milke and told police she was not involved in the crime, but she was convicted and sentenced to death in 1990 after Detective Armando Saldate testified that she had confessed to the crime, though her confession was not recorded. Saldate was later revealed to have lied under oath or faked confessions from suspects in at least eight previous cases, which led to Milke being granted a new trial and released on bail in 2013. Prosecutors intended to try Milke again, but in 2014 the Arizona Court of Appeals ordered the case dismissed due to police misconduct. | | | | |
| 1989 | Mark Denny | Sexual assault, robbery, other violent felony | Manhattan, New York | 19–57 years | 28 years | Yes |

== 1990s ==
| Date of crime | Defendant(s) | Crime | Location | Sentence | Time served | Legally exonerated |
|---|---|---|---|---|---|---|
| 1990 | Jeffrey Mark Deskovic | Murder and rape | Peekskill, New York | Life imprisonment | 16 years | Yes |
| 1990 | Jeffrey Mark Deskovic | Deskovic was convicted of the murder of Angela Correa on the basis of a coerced confession. He claims that during a 7-hour intensive interrogation, detectives fed him details and promised him he wouldn't go to prison if he confessed. Hair and semen samples collected did not match Deskovic, but prosecutors argued that they were from earlier consensual sex and were not related to the murder. The DNA was later matched to a man who is serving time for another Westchester murder. | | | | |
| Jan 22, 1990 | Laverne Pavlinac, John Sosnovske | Murder | Portland, Oregon | Life imprisonment | Four years | Yes |
| Jan 22, 1990 | Laverne Pavlinac, John Sosnovske | Pavlinac was in an abusive relationship with Sosnovske and, seeking to escape, made an anonymous phone call to the police in February 1990 accusing him of the abduction, rape and murder of Taunja Bennett the previous month. Pavlinac later told the police that she had seen Sosnovske standing over Bennett's body and helped him to dump the body by the Historic Columbia River Highway. She later changed her story and confessed to strangling Bennett after Sosnovske raped her. During the trial, Pavlinac recanted her statements and admitted she had made them up to escape from Sosnovske, who pled no contest to avoid the death penalty. The year after the trial, The Oregonian received a series of letters from a serial killer giving details of eight murders, including that of Taunja Bennett. It was also revealed that during the trial, graffito in the same handwriting as the letters had been left by a person claiming to be the killer of Taunja Bennett. This person was identified in 1995 as Keith Hunter Jesperson, who was convicted of all eight of the murders he had confessed to, including Taunja Bennett's murder. Law enforcement stated they had fully corroborated Jesperson's confession, but the courts initially refused to overturn the convictions of Pavlinac and Sosnovske. Jesperson himself began writing letters to the media calling for the two to be exonerated. Judge Paul Lipscomb overturned Pavlinac and Sosnovske's convictions in November 1995, declaring that their civil rights had been violated, although he condemned Pavlinac during the hearing for having framed Sosnovske in the first place. | | | | |
| Feb 24, 1990 | Lathierial Boyd | Murder | Chicago | 82 years | 23 years | Yes |
| Feb 24, 1990 | Lathierial Boyd | Boyd was accused of fatally shooting Michael Fleming outside a nightclub in the North Side of Chicago. Ricky Warner, who survived the shooting, identified Boyd as the man who shot him, but his evidence was questionable as the shooter had been standing behind him. Boyd was convicted after his lawyer failed to question witnesses who would have placed him away from the scene. His conviction was vacated in 2013 after an appeal on his behalf by Kathleen Zellner revealed that detective Richard Zuley had concealed the existence of nine other eyewitnesses who said the shooter did not look like Boyd. | | | | |
| Oct 27, 1990 | Emel McDowell | Murder | New York City, New York | 22 years to life | 19 years | Yes |
| Oct 27, 1990 | Emel McDowell | McDowell and some friends were at a party in Bedford-Stuyvesant, Brooklyn, when a fight broke out. One of McDowell's friends opened fire, killing 19-year-old Jonathan Powell. Two people identified McDowell as the shooter, while others identified his friend. Despite the shooter sending McDowell a letter where he admitted to the shooting, he was convicted of murder. In 2009, he took a deal to plead guilty to manslaughter and was released on time served. In 2023, the Brooklyn District Attorney vacated his conviction in March 2023. | | | | |
| Nov 17, 1990 | Jeff Titus | Murder | Kalamazoo, Michigan | Life imprisonment | 21 years | Yes |
| Nov 17, 1990 | Jeff Titus | Two hunters, Doug Estes and Jim Bennett, were fatally shot near Titus' property. Twelve years later, Titus was charged with their murders. Prosecutors accused Titus of killing the two because he didn't like trespassers, despite there being no physical evidence pointing to Titus being the killer. An appeal was filed in 2018, with the Innocence Clinic stating that Titus' lawyer was never informed that an investigator believed there could have been two shooters. Two years later, a file from the investigation was recovered that referred to a different suspect—serial killer Thomas Dillon, who killed five men in southeastern Ohio from 1989 to 1992. The evidence against Dillon included witnesses who identified Dillon at the scene and a car that resembled Dillon's wife's, as well as a cellmate of Dillon who told the FBI that Dillon had bragged about killing two people in the woods. Titus' lawyer had also not been informed of that file. Dillon died in 2011. In 2023, a judge threw out Titus' murder convictions and ordered his release. | | | | |
| 1991 and before | Dan and Frances Keller | Child sexual abuse* | Oak Hill | 48 years | 22 years | Yes |
| 1991 and before | Dan and Frances Keller | The Kellers, owners of a daycare in Austin, were accused of satanic ritual abuse by children under their care who claimed to have been sexually abused by multiple adults and forced to participate in the ritual sacrifice of animals. During the trial, the child who initially accused them retracted her testimony and said she had been coached to accuse the couple of abuse. Medical evidence supposedly pointing to sexual abuse was later discredited, with the prosecution's expert witness admitting under oath that he was mistaken during appeals proceedings. The Kellers' convictions were overturned and they were released from prison in 2013; the charges against them were dropped four years later. | | | | |
| Jan 18, 1991 | Francisco "Franky" Carrillo | Murder | Los Angeles, California | Life imprisonment | 20 years | Yes |
| Jan 18, 1991 | Francisco "Franky" Carrillo | Carrillo was convicted of the murder of Donald Sarpy on the basis of testimony of six teenage boys who witnessed the murder. He was released after five of the six witnesses recanted; the sixth refused to testify. | | | | |
| May 23, 1991 | Roy Brown | Murder | Cayuga, New York | Life imprisonment | 16 years | Yes |
| May 23, 1991 | Roy Brown | Brown was convicted of the murder of Sabrina Kulakowski on January 23, 1992. Bite marks were left on Sabrina's shirt that did not match with Brown's, as Brown was missing teeth and the bite marks did not match with his missing teeth. Nonetheless, due to improper analysis, refusal of analyzing various DNA samples, and arguable incompetence, Brown was wrongly convicted of Sabrina's murder. In January 2005, correspondence between Brown and The Innocence Project began, where they requested additional DNA testing of additional saliva spots left on Sabrina's shirt. These samples did not match Brown's DNA, and were attributed to a deceased Barry Bench. Brown was not immediately released despite this, and Barry Bench's body was exhumed and compared to a DNA sample of Bench's daughter. On January 23, 2007, Brown was released from prison. On March 7, 2007, prosecution dismissed Brown's charges. Brown was awarded $2.6 million in compensation. | | | | |
| May 25, 1991 | Michelle Lodzinski | Murder of Timothy Wiltsey | Sayreville, New Jersey | 30 years | 7 years | Yes |
| May 25, 1991 | Michelle Lodzinski | 5-year-old Timothy Wiltsey disappeared in May 1991 while visiting a carnival with his mother, Michelle Lodzinski. His body was found in nearby Edison the following year. Lodzinski told several different stories to the police, eventually telling them that Timothy was taken by two men and a woman who she had briefly left him with while she bought soda; three witnesses had indeed seen three people fitting Lodzinski's descriptions with a boy they believed to be Timothy. Lodzinski was convicted of Timothy's murder 23 years later after a witness identified a blanket found with Timothy's body as being one from Lodzinski's house, although several other witnesses disagreed and said it was not the same blanket. In 2021, the Supreme Court of New Jersey acquitted Lodzinski on appeal, finding that there was not enough evidence to support the charges. | | | | |
| Aug 14, 1991 | John Bunn | Murder | Brooklyn, New York | Life imprisonment | 16 years | Yes |
| Aug 14, 1991 | John Bunn | Bunn was convicted of the murder of Rolando Neischer in 1992. Bunn was one of 15 individuals whose convictions were overturned during 2013–2019 after long prison terms, in Brooklyn homicide cases involving the retired New York City Police Department detective Louis N. Scarcella. | | | | |
| Nov 1991 | Dixmoor 5: Robert Taylor, Jonathan Barr, James Harden, Robert Lee Veal, and Shainne Sharp | Murder and rape | Dixmoor, Illinois | 20–85 years | varied | Yes |
| Nov 1991 | Dixmoor 5: Robert Taylor, Jonathan Barr, James Harden, Robert Lee Veal, and Shainne Sharp | Robert Taylor, Jonathan Barr, James Harden, Robert Lee Veal, and Shainne Sharp were convicted of the murder of Cateresa Matthews. They were between the ages of 14 and 16 at the time. Three of them confessed after high-pressure police interrogations, and all five were arrested and charged with the crime. Two pleaded guilty and testified against the others in exchange for shorter sentences. Both men have since recanted their testimony. Each received at least 80 years in prison. DNA testing on semen excluded the suspects. A convicted sex offender has been identified as the source of the DNA, but his name has yet to be released and he has not been charged. A suit filed by the men alleges police withheld exculpatory evidence, including the DNA, from their defense teams. In 2014, they reached a wrongful conviction settlement with the state of Illinois for $40 million US dollars, the largest wrongful conviction settlement in state history. | | | | |
| Nov 10, 1991 | Sonia Cacy | Murder and arson* | Fort Stockton, Texas | 99 years | Five years | Yes |
| Nov 10, 1991 | Sonia Cacy | In November 1991, 76-year-old Bill Richardson was killed in a house fire in Fort Stockton, Texas. Traces of an accelerant were supposedly found on his clothes, which led prosecutors to accuse his stepdaughter Sonia Cacy, who was the only other person in the house at the time, of setting him on fire in his sleep to claim her inheritance. Scientific analysis later determined that there was no accelerant on Richardson's clothes: what was believed to be gasoline was in fact melted plastic from Richardson's mattress. Evidence suggested that the fire was likely started by Richardson dropping a lit cigarette which ignited his sheets. The Texas Board of Pardons and Paroles ordered Cacy's release in 1998 based on the scientific evidence, and her conviction was eventually vacated in 2016. | | | | |
| Dec 6, 1991 | Robert Springsteen, Michael Scott | Austin yogurt shop murders | Austin, Texas | Death (commuted to life imprisonment; Springsteen), life imprisonment (Scott) | Eight years | Yes |
| Dec 6, 1991 | Robert Springsteen, Michael Scott | Just before midnight on December 6, 1991, firefighters discovered the bodies of four teenage girls inside the I Can't Believe It's Yogurt shop in Austin, Texas. The victims had been bound, raped and shot in the head. 15-year-old Michael Scott was initially suspected after he was arrested with a gun in a nearby mall, but ballistics evidence established that the gun was not the murder weapon. However, several years later Scott and three of his friends - Robert Springsteen, Maurice Pierce, and Forrest Welborn - were interviewed on suspicion of murder and Springsteen and Scott implicated each other in the crime. They later recanted their confessions, but were convicted of the murders. Their convictions were overturned in 2006 and 2007 because their right to confront their accuser had been violated during their trials, and DNA testing exonerated them in 2009. In 2025, DNA testing suggested that serial killer Robert Eugene Brashers, who committed suicide in 1999, had committed the murders. A judge declared Springsteen, Scott, Pierce, and Welborn innocent in 2026. | | | | |
| Dec 29, 1991 | Ray Krone | Murder | Maricopa County, Arizona | Death (commuted to life imprisonment) | 11 years | Yes |
| Dec 29, 1991 | Ray Krone | Krone was twice convicted of the murder of Kim Ancona largely on the basis of bitemark analysis, a science that would later come into question. He was eventually cleared via DNA testing. | | | | |
| Jan 31, 1992 | Mark Mason Jones, Kenneth Eric Gardiner, and Dominic Brian Lucci | Malice murder, firearm possession | Savannah, Georgia | Life imprisonment | 25 years | Yes |
| Jan 31, 1992 | Mark Mason Jones, Kenneth Eric Gardiner, and Dominic Brian Lucci | Three white servicemen stationed at Fort Stewart, Jones, Gardiner, and Lucci, were convicted of the drive-by slaying of Stanley Jackson. The sole witness, James White, who is black, admitted to lying decades later, which helped start a review of the case. Prosecutors said the crime was racially motivated. The state's Supreme Court ruled that the government prosecutors improperly withheld evidence. The Georgia legislature approved financial compensation to each of the three men. | | | | |
| Apr 6, 1992 | Robert Jones | Manslaughter, aggravated rape, kidnapping, armed robbery | New Orleans, Louisiana | Life imprisonment | 23 years | Yes |
| Apr 6, 1992 | Robert Jones | Jones was convicted largely on eyewitness identification, even though another man was also found guilty of the crimes and the prosecution withheld exculpatory evidence. Jones' conviction was eventually overturned by the Louisiana Supreme Court, and all charges against him were subsequently dropped. | | | | |
| Aug 17, 1992 | Juan Rivera | Murder | Waukegan, Illinois | Life imprisonment | 20 years | Yes |
| Aug 17, 1992 | Juan Rivera | Rivera was wrongfully convicted three times for the murder of 11-year-old Holly Staker, who was babysitting at a neighbor's house when she was raped and murdered by an intruder. Swabs were taken of a semen sample, but DNA testing was not performed at the time. Rivera was convicted on the basis of a confession that he claims was given under duress and which contained many factual inconsistencies. He was convicted twice before DNA testing was performed on the swabs taken from the crime scene. DNA testing excluded Rivera from being the source of the semen. Prosecutors decided to try him again despite the results of the DNA test, arguing that the semen sample was from consensual sex prior to the murder. He was convicted a third time. His case was overturned a third and final time with the appellate court heavily criticizing prosecutors for arguing that Holly was sexually active without evidence and for putting so much weight on a confession obtained while Rivera, who suffered from mental illness, was in an "acute psychotic state" and which contained so many inaccuracies. Following his exoneration, his defense team sought to do further testing on shoes that the state had once sought to enter into evidence. Holly's blood was found on shoes worn by Juan. The evidence had been dropped once it was discovered that the shoes were not for sale anywhere in the US until after the murder. Genetic testing performed in 2014 found not only Holly's blood, but genetic material that matches the semen found at the crime scene. His defense team argued that the reasonable interpretation is that in an effort to plant blood on Juan's shoes, the state also planted DNA from Holly's real killer. Following this revelation, the state agreed to settle with Rivera, giving him a US$20 million settlement, which at the time was the largest wrongful conviction settlement in US history. The source of the DNA has never been identified, but it has been linked to evidence found at another murder scene. The man convicted of that murder insists this is proof that he himself has been wrongfully convicted. | | | | |
| Sept 13-Dec 16, 1992 | David Allen Jones | Murder | Los Angeles, California | Life imprisonment | Nine years | Yes |
| Sept 13-Dec 16, 1992 | David Allen Jones | Between September and December 1992, four prostitutes were raped and murdered near an elementary school in southern Los Angeles. Police suspected an intellectually disabled man named David Allen Jones, who was arrested for trying to rape a prostitute near the school. He was interrogated without a lawyer until he confessed to all four murders. He later retracted his confession and serological testing showed that the killer was a different blood type, but Jones was ultimately convicted of three of the murders. When the case was reviewed in 2002 it was revealed that murders featuring the same signature had continued after Jones' arrest. DNA linked these murders and two of the murders Jones was convicted of to serial killer Chester Turner (evidence in the other two murders could not be tested). Jones's convictions were vacated in 2004. | | | | |
| Oct 14, 1992 | Maleek Jones | Murder | New Haven, Connecticut | 65 years | 31 years | Yes |
| Oct 14, 1992 | Maleek Jones | Eddie Harp was shot and killed as he drove past a hospital in the Dwight neighborhood. Eight hours after the shooting, Gene John confessed that he and another man, Tyrone Spears, had killed Harp, but police suppressed the confession. John was killed six months later. Police pressured Spears to confess that there was a third shooter, Jones, despite physical evidence ruling that possibility out. In addition, the only witness to Harp's murder was never called to testify. The case was reopened in 2015 and his conviction was overturned in 2023. | | | | |
| Jan 1993 | Mary Weaver | Murder* | Marshall County, Iowa | Life without parole | 3 years | Yes |
| Jan 1993 | Mary Weaver | In January 1993, babysitter Mary Weaver called 911 to report that 11-month-old Melissa Mathes was unresponsive. The child was rushed to the hospital and died the next day. While the autopsy revealed that Melissa sustained significant head injuries sometime before her death, the medical examiners concluded that the cause of death was Shaken Baby Syndrome (SBS), caused by Mary violently shaking the baby. Mary was charged with first-degree murder, but when the jury could not reach a verdict, the case ended in a mistrial. Mary opted for a bench trial for her second trial, and the judge ultimately found Mary guilty and sentenced her to life in prison without the possibility of parole. The Iowa Court of Appeals upheld her conviction, but the Iowa Supreme Court granted a hearing for a new trial. At the hearing, multiple witnesses testified that Melissa had hit her head on the coffee table and was knocked unconscious. Mary's motion for a new trial was granted, and in February 1997, the jury acquitted her of the charges. | | | | |
| Apr 8, 1993 | Gary Gauger | Murder | McHenry County, Illinois | Death by lethal injection | 3 years | Yes |
| Apr 8, 1993 | Gary Gauger | Gary Gauger's parents, Morris and Ruth Gauger, were murdered in 1993. Following the murder, police interrogated Gauger for 21 hours. Detectives lied to Gauger, claiming they had found blood-soaked clothes in Gauger's bedroom and that he had failed a polygraph test. Gauger was instructed to discuss a hypothetical situation and describe how he would have killed his parents during a possible alcohol-induced blackout. The interrogation was not tape-recorded and Gauger did not sign a confession. His hypothetical statements were later used in court in support of a claim that Gauger confessed to the crime. In 1996, he was granted an appeal and his alleged confession was thrown out. Without that evidence they were forced to drop the charges. James Schneider and Randall E. Miller, members of the Outlaws Motorcycle Club, were later convicted of the murders. Gauger was pardoned in 2002. | | | | |
| Feb 13, 1993 | Lynn DeJac | Murder* | Buffalo, New York | 25 years | 14 years | Yes |
| Feb 13, 1993 | Lynn DeJac | Lynn DeJac summoned police to her home on February 13, 1993, after finding her daughter, Crystallyn Girard, dead in her bed. DeJac told police that she spent the evening out with her boyfriend, Dennis Donohue, with whom she had had an argument that evening. The coroner ruled that she died from strangulation. Donohue became a suspect for a brief time after DeJac told police he may have returned to her house while she was out. He was arrested, but was later granted full immunity in return for testimony regarding DeJac's use of cocaine that evening. Wayne Hudson, a childhood friend of DeJac, claimed that DeJac confessed to him that she had killed her daughter. She was convicted on the basis of the testimony from the two men. At the time he came forward, Hudson was facing forgery charges and a possible life sentence in prison as a repeat offender. In 2008, a new autopsy determined that Crystallyn died of a cocaine overdose, not strangulation. However, DeJac has insisted that her daughter was murdered by Hudson. | | | | |
| Apr 7, 1993 | Weldon Carr | Murder and arson* | Sandy Springs, Georgia | Life imprisonment | Two years | Yes |
| Apr 7, 1993 | Weldon Carr | The home of Weldon and Patricia Carr burned down in April 1993, resulting in Patricia's death from smoke inhalation. Weldon Carr was prosecuted by Nancy Grace, who accused him of deliberately starting the fire after discovering that Patricia was planning to leave him. Fire investigators found no evidence of arson, but Grace illegally allowed an outside witness to access the scene who claimed their dog had detected traces of an accelerant. Carr was convicted. Two years later, the Georgia Supreme Court overturned the conviction on the grounds of prosecutorial misconduct and criticized Grace, who the court said had "demonstrated her disregard of the notions of due process". Litigation continued for another four years as the state looked for an arson expert to retry the case; the Georgia Supreme Court ruled that the delay violated Carr's right to a speedy trial and dismissed the case against him in 2004. | | | | |
| May 5, 1993 | West Memphis Three: Damien Echols, Jason Baldwin, Jesse Misskelley | Murder | West Memphis, Arkansas | Death (Echols), Life imprisonment (Baldwin and Misskelley) | 18 years | No |
| May 5, 1993 | West Memphis Three: Damien Echols, Jason Baldwin, Jesse Misskelley | On May 5, 1993, three eight-year-old boys – Chris Byers, Michael Moore, and Stevie Branch – were reported missing in West Memphis. The following day, investigators recovered the bound, naked, mutilated corpses of the three boys in a stream. Suspicion soon fell on Damien Echols, a local teenager with psychiatric problems and an interest in the occult, after a local waitress claimed that she had seen him and his friend Jesse Misskelley at a Satanic orgy in the woods where the boys were found (she would eventually recant this statement in 2003). Misskelley, who had below-average IQ, was interrogated and confessed to committing the crime alongside Echols and their friend Jason Baldwin; however, his confession was riddled with inconsistencies and false claims, and he had recanted by the time of the trial. Two girls also claimed to have overheard Echols at a softball game talking about killing the three boys, and Baldwin's cellmate testified that he had admitted to the crime while awaiting trial. Prosecutors accused the three teenagers of carrying out the murders as part of a Satanic ritual. All three were convicted at two separate trials and Misskelley and Baldwin were sentenced to life without parole, while Echols received the death penalty. In the years after the trial, a series of documentaries suggested that the so-called "West Memphis Three" may have been innocent and were convicted due to moral panic over their interest in the occult, that Jesse Misskelley's confession was coerced, and that other witnesses had testified falsely. In 2007, DNA from the scene was tested and did not belong to Echols, Misskelley, or Baldwin; however, it was consistent with Stevie Branch's stepfather, Terry Hobbs, and his friend, David Jacoby. Evidence was also found of misconduct by jurors at Baldwin and Echols' trial. In November 2010, the Supreme Court of Arkansas ordered a new hearing on the case. However, before the hearing could take place, prosecutors reached a deal in August 2011 in which Echols, Misskelley, and Baldwin were released from prison in return for entering Alford pleas (pleading guilty without actually admitting guilt). All three continued to maintain their innocence after their release from prison, but the case was never re-opened. | | | | |
| Aug 29, 1993 | Mark Maxson | Murder | Chicago, Illinois | Life imprisonment | 23 years | Yes |
| Aug 29, 1993 | Mark Maxson | Police subjected Maxson to torture and beatings until he made a confession to the murder of six-year-old Lindsay Murdoch. In spite of withdrawing his confession and lack of physical evidence against him, Maxson was convicted and sentenced to life plus 40 years. In 2015 the Cook County Conviction Integrity Unit got DNA testing done which proved another man, Osborne Wade, had committed the murder. Wade confessed to the murder. | | | | |
| 1994 | Dontae Sharpe | Murder | Greenville, North Carolina | Life imprisonment | 24 years | Yes |
| 1994 | Dontae Sharpe | On April 7, 1994, Sharpe was arrested for the murder of a 33-year-old man, George Radcliffe. He was convicted despite a lack of testimony and the existence of another potential suspect. Immediately after he was convicted and sentenced to life in prison, a leading witness recanted her testimony. Nevertheless, Sharpe remained in prison until his exoneration and release in August 2019. He received a pardon of innocence from Governor Roy Cooper on 12 November 12, 2021. | | | | |
| Jan 1994 | Freddie Joe Lawrence and Paul Jenkins | Murder and kidnapping | Montana City, Montana | Life imprisonment | 23 years | Yes |
| Jan 1994 | Freddie Joe Lawrence and Paul Jenkins | Lawrence and Jenkins were convicted of murdering Donna Meagher, who was kidnapped as she closed her family's casino and murdered near Helena. In 2018, a man serving a life sentence for a double homicide confessed to the murder, and DNA confirmed the man was at the scene. Lawrence and Jenkins' convictions were subsequently overturned. | | | | |
| Feb 3, 1994 | Adam Carmon | Murder | New Haven, Connecticut | 85 years | 28 years | Yes |
| Feb 3, 1994 | Adam Carmon | In February 1994, a gunman fired through an apartment window, killing 7-month-old Danielle Taft and paralyzing her grandmother. A man went to the police station and implicated himself and a second man, but the prosecution did not disclose this to the defense. Police also stopped investigating after determining Carmon's gun was the murder weapon. In December 2022 a judge ruled that prosecutors withheld information from the defense, and Carmon's charges were dismissed. | | | | |
| Apr 30, 1994 | Ken Wyniemko | Criminal sexual conduct, armed robbery, breaking and entering | Clinton Township, Michigan | 40–60 years | 8 years | Yes |
| Apr 30, 1994 | Ken Wyniemko | Wyniemko was convicted on the basis of his resemblance to the composite sketch and identification of Wyniemko in a lineup by the victim. He was later cleared by DNA testing. | | | | |
| May 2, 1994 | Barry Lee Jones | Murder | Tucson, Arizona | Death | 29 years | Partially |
| May 2, 1994 | Barry Lee Jones | 4-year-old Rachel Gray was pronounced dead after being brought to a community hospital in Tucson by her mother, Angela Gray, and her mother's boyfriend, Barry Jones. Her death soon raised suspicions of child abuse, as she had suffered extensive injuries consistent with long-term abuse, and an autopsy found she had been raped, with her cause of death being peritonitis from the injuries suffered during the rape. Jones claimed her injuries were the result of another child knocking her out of his van, but part of his story, about having her examined by paramedics, was revealed to be a lie. Jones and Gray were both charged with murder and stood trial separately. At Gray's trial, her children testified that she, not Jones, had abused them, but the jury at Jones' trial never heard this; Gray was acquitted of murder but found guilty of child abuse. Many witnesses at Jones' trial were children whose testimonies changed dramatically between investigation and trial, and the defense had failed to investigate evidence that numerous other people, including Rachel's brother, could have molested her. Jones was convicted of murder and sentenced to death. Years after the trial, Jones' new legal team discovered that the state's medical examiner, who had testified that Rachel's fatal injuries were consistent with being inflicted on May 1 while she was in Jones' care, had previously testified at Gray's trial that they were most likely inflicted the day before. Several other experts agreed that her injuries were almost certainly not inflicted on May 1. Incriminating blood evidence was also called into question, and evidence withheld by the state was found which supported Jones' story about Rachel being injured by neighborhood boys. The Supreme Court ruled in Shinn v. Ramirez that Jones was not entitled to Federal relief, but state prosecutors decided to review the evidence and agreed to vacate Jones' first-degree murder conviction, concluding he was not the killer. However, they argued that his failure to take Rachel to hospital earlier despite knowing she was injured, and his lies about having her examined by paramedics, meant he was still culpable for second-degree murder. Jones agreed to plead guilty to this charge and was sentenced to time served and released. | | | | |
| Sep 1994 | Michelle Murphy | Murder | Tulsa, Oklahoma | Life without parole | 19 years | Yes |
| Sep 1994 | Michelle Murphy | In September 1994, 17-year-old Michelle Murphy awoke to find her infant son Travis stabbed to death in her kitchen. Police quickly set their sights on Michelle, and in violation of Oklahoma law, interrogated the teenager alone for eight hours. Despite the fact that Murphy's blood was not found on the scene, both the prosecutor and crime scene analyst suggested that her blood was present as proof of her guilt. In November 1995, Michelle was convicted of first-degree murder and sentenced to life in prison without parole. In 2011, Michelle's appellate lawyers discovered that the prosecution lied about the lab's blood analysis. After DNA testing discovered DNA of an unknown male at the crime scene, Murphy's conviction was vacated, and in September 2014, the charges were dismissed. | | | | |
| Sep 12, 1994 | John Grega | Murder | West Dover, Vermont | Life without parole | 18 years | Yes |
| Sep 12, 1994 | John Grega | Christine Grega was raped and choked to death while vacationing in West Dover in September 1994. Her husband John stood to gain thousands of dollars in life insurance from her death and police highlighted inconsistencies in his timeline of events. He was sentenced to life without parole. In 2012, DNA evidence proved his innocence and his conviction was overturned. | | | | |
| Oct 30, 1994 | Lamar Johnson | Murder | St. Louis, Missouri | Life imprisonment | 28 years | Yes |
| Oct 30, 1994 | Lamar Johnson | Two men entered the home of Marcus Boyd and shot him, with prosecutors saying it was a dispute over drug money. Johnson and another man, Phil Campbell, were arrested and charged with the murder, with Campbell pleading guilty, while Johnson was convicted in 1995. Johnson testified that he was at his girlfriend's home the whole night aside from a five-minute period where he made a drug sale. A witness who said Johnson was involved later recanted his testimony, while another inmate later stated it was him, not Johnson, who had accompanied Campbell. His conviction was vacated in 2023, with a judge citing "actual innocence". | | | | |
| 1995 | Wenatchee child abuse defendants | Child sexual abuse* | Wenatchee, Washington | Varied | Varied | |
| 1995 | Wenatchee child abuse defendants | In January 1995, Detective Robert Perez was told by his foster daughter Donna that she had been sexually abused before she lived with him. In March 1995 Perez drove his daughter round the neighbourhood where she used to live identifying the houses where, she claimed, she and other children had been raped. Of the 43 identified suspects, 25 were convicted or pled guilty based on testimony from Donna and other children, many of whom had behavioural problems. Several of the children, including Donna, later recanted and accused Detective Perez of pressuring them into making accusations. All of the convicted defendants were eventually released; the final conviction from the case was vacated in 2000. | | | | |
| Mar 2, 1995 | Shareef Cousin | Murder | New Orleans, Louisiana | Death by lethal injection | 4 years | Yes |
| Mar 2, 1995 | Shareef Cousin | Cousin was convicted of Michael Gerardi's murder on the basis of three eyewitnesses. Two identified Cousin as part of a group three black male teenagers involved in the murder. The third witness, Connie Babin, identified Cousin as the triggerman. Cousin allegedly confessed to the murder to his friend, James Rowell, who agreed to become a witness for the prosecution. However, Rowell later claimed he was coerced to falsely implicate Cousin in exchange for a reduced sentence on other charges. To rebut this claim, the prosecution had three witnesses, including Rowell's lawyer, testify. Rowell's lawyer said Rowell had privately told him that Cousin had confessed to the murder. Cousin's conviction was overturned on appeal since the prosecution had unfairly used hearsay evidence in closing arguments and withheld evidence that would've cast doubt on the reliability of Babin's identification of Cousin as the triggerman. The prosecution declined to retry Cousin for the murder. Cousin remained in prison for separate armed robbery convictions until 2005. | | | | |
| Apr 14, 1995 (discovered) | Alan Gell | Murder | Aulander, North Carolina | Death by lethal injection | 9 years | Yes |
| Apr 14, 1995 (discovered) | Alan Gell | Allen Ray Jenkins, age 56, was found dead on April 14, 1995, in his home in Aulander, North Carolina. He had been shot twice in the chest with a shotgun. In the days and weeks after the murder, the police talked to several disinterested witnesses who said they had seen Jenkins alive as late as April 10. Two teenage girls testified that they were involved in a conspiracy involving Gell in exchange for a lower sentence. Gell was in prison or otherwise out of town for all but one day in April. Although the date of death is unknown, prosecutors hitched their timeline to that date. Gell's conviction was overturned after it was later discovered that prosecutors had withheld exculpatory evidence, including the testimony of 17 witnesses who said they had seen Jenkins alive after that date as well as a tape recording of one of the girls saying that she had to make up a story to tell the police. Gell was retried and acquitted of all charges. | | | | |
| Jul 1995 | Rosalynd Collier-Hammond | Child sexual abuse* | Cuyahoga County, Ohio | Life imprisonment | 18 years | Yes |
| Jul 1995 | Rosalynd Collier-Hammond | In July 1995, Rosalynd Collier-Hammond was released from prison for robbery and sought to rekindle her relationship with her daughter, A.Y. However, A.Y. was angry at her mother, having been told by her father that Rosalynd abandoned her. A.Y. went on to claim that her mother and stepfather, Reynard Hammond, sexually abused her while under their care. Rosalynd and Reynard were charged with rape, and in April 1999, Rosalynd was convicted and sentenced to two concurrent life sentences, while Reynard was acquitted of all charges. 15 years later, A.Y., now 32, revealed to her aunt that her father forced her to falsely accuse Rosalynd of sexual abuse. At a hearing for a new trial, A.Y. testified, "She never did anything that I said she's done to me. All that came about because that's what my father told me to say." Rosalynd was granted a new trial, and in April 2017, after multiple unsuccessful appeals, prosecutors dismissed the case. | | | | |
| August 30, 1995 | Chaunte Ott | Murder | Milwaukee, Wisconsin | Life imprisonment | 13 years | Yes |
| August 30, 1995 | Chaunte Ott | 16-year-old runaway Jessica Payne was found dead on August 30, 1995. She had been sexually assaulted, and her throat had been cut. One month later, a prison inmate named Richard Gwin claimed that two other men, Chaunte Ott and Sammy Hadaway, had murdered Payne. Hadaway later confessed to being involved in the crime, claiming that Ott had forced him to hold Payne down while he tried to rape her and cut her throat. Ott was sentenced to life imprisonment with no chance of parole for 50 years in 1996. In 2002 DNA testing found that the semen on Payne's body did not belong to Ott, Hadaway, or Gwin, and in 2007 the DNA was linked to two unsolved murders that occurred after Ott's conviction. Hadaway was re-interviewed by police and confessed that he had not been involved in the murder and had falsely implicated Ott to protect himself from charges. Ott was released from prison and the charges against him dismissed in 2009; later that year, the DNA from the three murders was linked to serial killer Walter E. Ellis. | | | | |
| August 30, 1995 | Sammy Hadaway | Attempted robbery | Milwaukee, Wisconsin | 5 years | 3 years | Yes |
| August 30, 1995 | Sammy Hadaway | Hadaway, who had mental deficiencies as a result of cerebral palsy, confessed to police (after an interview that was not recorded, without the presence of an attorney) that he had helped Chaunte Ott to rob Jessica Payne before Ott sexually assaulted and killed her. He pled guilty to attempted robbery after Ott's conviction and was jailed for five years, of which he served three. Hadaway later recanted his statement after DNA exonerated Ott and admitted that he had implicated Ott out of fear that he would be charged with murder if he did not confess. The Wisconsin Innocence Project asked a higher court to revoke Hadaway's guilty plea, which was eventually granted in 2018, and the charges against him were dismissed later that year. | | | | |
| November 26, 1995 | Vincent Ellerbe, James Irons, and Thomas Malik | Murder | New York City, NY | Life imprisonment | 25 years | Yes |
| November 26, 1995 | Vincent Ellerbe, James Irons, and Thomas Malik | Around 1 a.m. on Nov. 26, 1995, two men approached a subway token booth in Brooklyn, poured gas through the slot and lit a book of matches. The resulting explosion leveled the structure and sent the clerk inside flying, his body in flames. He died two weeks later. Three teenagers, Vincent Ellerbe, James Irons and Thomas Malik, subsequently confessed to the crime, were convicted of second-degree murder and were sentenced to 25 years to life in prison. On July 15, 2022, a state court judge cleared the three at the request of the Brooklyn district attorney, who said his office had determined the confessions were false and had been coerced by detectives whose work in dozens of other cases has come under scrutiny. | | | | |
| 1996 | Kristine Bunch | Murder and arson* | Decatur County, Indiana | 110 years | 17 years | Yes |
| 1996 | Kristine Bunch | Bunch was convicted of deliberately setting a fire in her mobile home that took the life of her 3-year-old son, Anthony. The conviction was largely based on the testimonies of Fire Marshall investigators Brian Frank and James Skaggs, who claimed that the fire was caused by the presence of liquid accelerants that had been poured across the floor. Their testimony was corroborated by forensic analyst William Kinard, who found traces of liquid accelerants in wood samples taken from the home. During the trial, Bunch had become pregnant. At Bunch's sentencing hearing, Judge John Westhafer accused her of orchestrating the pregnancy to gain an advantage in court and declared that she will "have nothing to do with that child." Bunch maintained her innocence. Years later, lawyers found that Kinard's original report found no traces of liquid accelerants anywhere in the home and that Frank and Skaggs conspired with Kinard to alter the report to score a conviction. In 2008, in light of the fabricated evidence against Bunch, her legal team filed a petition for a new trial, which was rejected by Judge Westhafter. The defense appealed, and in March 2012, the Court of Appeals of Indiana reversed the conviction and held that Bunch was entitled to a new trial. In August 2012, the Indiana Supreme Court declined to disturb the Court of Appeals decision. 24 days later, Bunch was released on her own recognizance, and in December 2012, the prosecution dropped the remaining charges against her. | | | | |
| Jun 13, 1996 | Christopher Tapp | Murder and rape | Idaho Falls, Idaho | Life imprisonment | 20 years | Yes |
| Jun 13, 1996 | Christopher Tapp | On June 13, 1996, Angie Dodge was found raped and murdered in her Idaho Falls apartment. Months later in 1997, 20-year-old Tapp, a high school dropout, was arrested. Police interrogated him for 60 hours. He was subjected to sham polygraph tests and was told information that only the murderer would know. Then the police falsely said he had described the information himself. He confessed to police that he had been involved although he later retracted his confession. Tapp's DNA did not match samples taken at the crime scene, and no other physical evidence linked him to the crime. But at trial, that inconsistency was explained away by a theory that multiple people had participated in the killing. It was also outweighed by Tapp's confession. In 1998, Tapp was convicted by a jury of rape and murder and sentenced to 30 years to life. The Idaho Innocence Project took up Tapp's case in 2007. At the same time, more than a decade after her daughter's murder, Carol Dodge was still searching for answers. While Tapp had been convicted, authorities had failed to match the crime scene DNA to any suspect, though they believed the crime had more than one perpetrator. In 2017, in the face of mounting evidence of his innocence, Tapp's rape charge was vacated and his murder sentence was reduced to time served, allowing him to leave prison. But authorities still hadn't connected the DNA evidence with an alternate suspect. Then, in late 2018, police partnered with Parabon NanoLabs, a Virginia company that specializes in DNA analysis, to analyze crime scene evidence using genetic genealogy via GEDmatch which Eventually, narrowed down her results to a new suspect: Brian Leigh Dripps Sr who had lived across the street from Angie Dodge in 1996. Dripps admitted to the crimes and said had never met Tapp and had acted alone. Tapp was exonerated on July 17, 2019, which makes him the first man to be exonerated with use of genetic genealogy. | | | | |
| Jul 16, 1996 | Curtis Flowers | Murder | Winona, Mississippi | Death by lethal injection | 23 years | Yes |
| Jul 16, 1996 | Curtis Flowers | Curtis Flowers was tried six times for a 1996 quadruple murder in which four employees at the Tardy Furniture Company, which Flowers had been sacked from 13 days earlier, were shot to death. Eyewitnesses Clemmie Fleming and Roy Harris both claimed to have seen him running away from the crime scene on the day of the murder, and two prison inmates claimed that Flowers had confessed to the crime. A ballistics expert also allegedly matched the bullets to a gun stolen from Flowers' uncle on the day of the murder, although the Mississippi State Police crime lab could not link the bullets to the gun, and possible gunshot residue was found on Flowers' hand which he claimed had come from a firework. Flowers' first and second trials, for separate counts of murder, both ended in a conviction and death sentence. Between trials, Roy Harris recanted his testimony and testified at the second trial that neither he nor Clemmie Fleming had seen Flowers near the crime scene. One of the jailhouse informants also recanted his testimony, and it was revealed that the other had previously admitted that he made up Flowers' confession for a lighter sentence, although he now maintained he was telling the truth. Flowers was still convicted, but both trials were overturned on technical grounds and Flowers was given a third trial for every count. At this trial, another jailhouse informant, Odell Hallman, testified that Flowers had confessed. Flowers was convicted, but this trial was also overturned due to racial discrimination on the all-white jury. Flowers' fourth and fifth trials, which had interracial juries, both ended in a hung jury; he was convicted at a sixth trial in 2010 and sent back to death row. Flowers alleged that the sixth trial, which had a jury of eleven whites and one black, was subject to the same racial discrimination as the third trial, and that the prosecution had deliberately excluded as many black jurors as possible. He appealed to the United States Supreme Court. In the meantime, the case was investigated by American Public Media. APM investigators spoke to Clemmie Fleming and Odell Hallman, both of whom recanted their testimony, as did several other witnesses who had supposedly seen Flowers traveling to and from the crime scene. In June 2019, the Supreme Court ruled in Flowers v. Mississippi that Flowers was a victim of racial discrimination and ordered a seventh trial. In light of the APM investigation, Attorney General Lynn Fitch decided there was not enough evidence to proceed and dropped the charges against Flowers. | | | | |
| 1996 | Richard Alexander | Rape | South Bend, Indiana | 20 years | 5 years | Yes |
| 1996 | Richard Alexander | Alexander was convicted of a series of rapes in South Bend, Indiana, and was dubbed the "River Park Rapist". He was convicted largely on the basis of eyewitness testimony. In 2001, with Alexander already having served five years in prison, an alleged burglar and child molester named Michael Murphy confessed to one of the two rapes of which Alexander had been convicted, knowing details only the true assailant would know. With this revelation, a judge ordered a new round of DNA testing in Alexander's case. Hairs found at the scene of the rape were submitted to mitochondrial DNA testing. At the time of Alexander's original conviction, such testing was not available in the state of Indiana. The tests proved that the DNA did not match Alexander's profile, but did match Murphy's. Alexander was released from prison on December 12, 2001. It is now believed that the River Park Rapist was actually two separate perpetrators. | | | | |
| Oct 18, 1996 | Darrell Lee Clark and Cain Joshua Storey | Murder | Rome, Georgia | Life imprisonment | 25 years | Yes |
| Oct 18, 1996 | Darrell Lee Clark and Cain Joshua Storey | On October 18, 1996, 15-year-old Brian Bowling was shot in the head at his family's mobile home moments after telling his girlfriend over the phone that he was playing Russian roulette with a gun brought by Storey. Although evidence suggested Bowling shot himself, Storey and Clark, who was at his own home when Bowling died, were charged with his death. Both were 17 at the time of the incident. In 2021, a podcast investigated the death and interviewed a witness who had claimed Storey and Clark plotted the murder of Bowling to cover up a theft the two had committed. The witness told the podcast that police had coerced her into giving false statements, threatening to take her children if she did not comply. Another witness, who had identified Clark as the person running through the yard, had actually based his testimony on an unrelated yet similar shooting, and he had never identified Clark as being in the yard, nor did he witness anyone in the yard. In December 2022, the District Attorney's office and a Superior Court judge agreed to dismiss the charges against them. Storey took a plea deal for involuntary manslaughter for bringing the gun, but was released due to time served. | | | | |
| Nov 22, 1996 | Oliver Jovanovic | Kidnapping and sexual abuse* | New York City | Life imprisonment | 20 months | Yes |
| Nov 22, 1996 | Oliver Jovanovic | Jovanovic met Jamie Rzucek online in 1996. They met up for a date on November 22 which ended with the two of them going back to Jovanovic's apartment. According to Rzucek, Jovanovic then held her captive for 20 hours, during which time he tortured and raped her; Jovanovic maintained that they had consensual BDSM sex. Jovanovic was convicted of kidnapping and sexual abuse in 1998 in spite of Rzucek having sent him an email the day after the alleged rape which indicated the sex was consensual. In 1999 his conviction was overturned after a higher court ruled that Jovanovic should have been allowed to present emails between him and Rzucek in the days before the alleged rape which showed they had been planning to meet up for BDSM. Rzucek refused to testify at Jovanovic's second trial and the charges were dropped in 2001. | | | | |
| Jan 14, 1997 | Jonathan Irons | Assault and burglary | O'Fallon, Missouri | 50 years | 23 years | Yes |
| Jan 14, 1997 | Jonathan Irons | A man arriving home heard a noise from his bedroom closet, encountering a burglar. When the man went to call 911, the burglar shot him and fled. Police arrested Irons, 16, after witnesses identified him and said he had a gun. He was tried as an adult and convicted. In 2007 lawyers reported that fingerprints belonging to neither the homeowner nor Irons were found, but tests conducted in 2014 were inconclusive. In 2018, a petition noted that a detective involved in the case had "bragged about his illegal and unconstitutional police misconduct during his tenure on the force." In 2020 Irons' conviction was dropped by a judge, who noted that his defense failed to call a witness who would have placed Irons in a different location from the crime scene. Irons' case was supported by professional basketball player Maya Moore. The two married a few months after his release. | | | | |
| Mar 1997 | Fancy Figueroa | Filing a false report* | Queens, New York | Community service | N/A | Yes |
| Mar 1997 | Fancy Figueroa | In March 1997, 16-year-old Fancy Figueroa was brutally raped by a man on her way home from school. When the medical examination revealed that Fancy was pregnant, the police accused Fancy of fabricating the rape to cover up her pregnancy. Fancy insisted that she was raped but was disbelieved. The police promised to search for the culprit if she gave them a written admission of her guilt but instead used her statement to charge her with filing a false report. Fancy pleaded guilty and was sentenced to community service. Six years later, DNA testing revealed that the DNA of convicted rapist Vincent Elias matched the DNA in Fancy's rape kit. Elias later pleaded guilty to raping Fancy and was sentenced to 22 years in prison. Fancy stated, "For six years, nobody believed me. I lost my family. I lost my freedom. I lost a little of my sanity." | | | | |
| Jul 8, 1997 | Norfolk Four: Derek Tice, Danial Williams, Joseph J. Dick Jr., and Eric C. Wilson | Murder and rape | Norfolk, Virginia | Varied, 8.5 years to life | 7–13 years | Yes |
| Jul 8, 1997 | Norfolk Four: Derek Tice, Danial Williams, Joseph J. Dick Jr., and Eric C. Wilson | Michelle Moore-Bosko was raped and murdered in her apartment. Police initially focused on a neighbor of Moore-Bosko, Danial Williams, coercing a confession with threats of receiving the death penalty if he did not plead guilty. When his DNA did not match the DNA found at the scene, police coerced confessions from Joseph J. Dick Jr., Eric C. Wilson, and Derek Tice, operating under the new theory that it was a gang rape and murder, even though none of the evidence at the scene pointed to this. After Dick, Tice, and Wilson's DNA failed to match the DNA found at the crime scene, three additional men were charged, though charges were dropped against these three after Tice refused to testify against them. Police later obtained a letter written by Omar Ballard, where he indicated that he had murdered Michelle Moore-Bosko. Ballard's DNA matched the DNA at the scene, and he admitted to the crime, stating that he had acted alone. However, the authorities refused to drop charges against the other four. Wilson pleaded not guilty and was acquitted of murder but was convicted of rape, and was sentenced to eight and a half years in prison. Williams sought to withdraw his guilty plea, but his motion was denied and he was given a life sentence. Dick pleaded guilty and was given a life sentence. Tice pleaded not guilty and was convicted of capital murder and rape, and was sentenced to two consecutive life terms. Although evidence from the scene indicated that there was only one assailant, by the time the cases came to trial, police and prosecutors were advancing the notion that there were eight participants in the rape and murder. Wilson was released from prison in 2005. In 2009, Virginia governor Tim Kaine granted Dick, Tice, and Williams "conditional pardons", which reduced their sentences to time served, but they were placed on parole and were required to register as sex offenders. Derek Tice won a full exoneration in 2011. In 2016, U.S. District Judge John Gibney vacated the convictions of Joseph Dick and Danial Williams, with the judge declaring that both men were innocent of the crime. In 2017, Virginia Governor Terry McAuliffe granted Joseph Dick, Derek Tice, Danial Williams, and Eric Wilson full pardons. | | | | |
| Jul 1997 | Susan Mellen | Murder | San Pedro, California | Life without parole | 17 years | Yes |
| Jul 1997 | Susan Mellen | In July 1997, 3 gang members named Lester Monllor, Chad Landrum and Santo "Payaso" Alvarez beat 30-year-old Richard Daly to death with a claw hammer in a lot owned by Allene Mellen. Multiple police informants identified the three men as the culprits. However, a few weeks after the murder, a woman named June Patti called the police and falsely implicated Susan Mellen, the daughter of the lot owner. Despite being told that Patti was not a credible witness, the police promptly arrested Susan while she was at a McDonald's with her young daughter and charged her with first degree murder. At trial, Susan's lawyer, an elderly family law attorney who had just experienced a stroke and was on probation for inadequate defense, failed to challenge Patti's false testimony or call key witnesses. Susan was convicted and sentenced to life in prison without parole. Landrum was also sentenced to life in prison, while Monllor was acquitted. Alvarez was never charged. Years later, Alvarez began to reveal that Susan was innocent and that she "took my place." Landrum and other witnesses further confirmed that Susan was not involved. Susan's lawyers also discovered that Patti's credibility issues were never disclosed to Susan's defense lawyer. In September 2014, in light of these revelations, the court vacated Susan's murder conviction and Susan was released. Susan was later declared factually innocent. | | | | |
| Oct 13, 1997 | Julie Rea Harper | Murder | Lawrenceville, Illinois | 65 years | 4 years | Yes |
| Oct 13, 1997 | Julie Rea Harper | In the early morning hours of October 13, 1997, 10-year-old Joel Kirkpatrick was stabbed to death in his bedroom. His mother, Julie Rea Harper, had visitation with him that weekend and testified that she was awakened by screams and rushed into her son's room, where she fought off the intruder. Despite the fact that Harper sustained substantial injuries, and the absence of any physical evidence linking her to the crime, the police immediately discounted her testimony and focused on her as the prime suspect. In 2000, Harper was charged with capital murder by special prosecutor Edwin Parkinson. When Harper requested two capital-qualified attorneys to defend her, in compliance with state law, Parkinson announced that he no longer intended to seek the death penalty, forcing Harper to rely on a public defender. During the trial, prosecutors asserted that Harper was angry about her loss in her custody battle with her ex-husband and used her pursuit of a post-graduate degree to vilify her as a career-obsessed woman with no time for a child. They also elicited false testimony from her ex-husband that she had once considered having an abortion (Harper was 17 at the time of Joel's birth) in order to demonstrate that she was capable of murder. In March 2002, Harper was convicted and sentenced to 65 years in prison. In 2004, Tommy Lynn Sells, a serial killer who murdered several children, confessed that he had broken into a home, stabbed a little boy to death and scuffled with a woman around the same time and place that Kirkpatrick was murdered. Sells' confession was remarkably similar to Harper's account of the crime. It was also discovered that the prosecution withheld exculpatory evidence and relied on false testimony from several deputies during the trial. In response, the Illinois Appellate Court reversed Harper's conviction and ordered a new trial. Harper was re-arrested immediately upon walking out of jail. In her retrial, the defense presented extensive forensic evidence substantiating Harper's account and established that her injuries could not have been self-inflicted. In July 2006, a jury found Harper not guilty of killing her son. Despite this, the day after her trial, Lawrence County State attorney Patrick Hahn praised Parkinson as "a man of the highest integrity." | | | | |
| November 12, 1997 | James Chad-Lewis Clay | Child sex abuse | Detroit, Michigan | 25–50 years | 1 year, 7 months | Yes |
| November 12, 1997 | James Chad-Lewis Clay | On November 12, 1997, a 15-year-old girl was raped in an alley near Hayes Street and Harper Avenue in Detroit, Michigan. She said she was dragged into the alley at gunpoint and a cloth was put over her head and was raped. She had not seen her attacker before. The girl was taken to a hospital where a rape kit was prepared. The crime went unsolved. It was not until 2009, when the Detroit Police Department obtained a federal grant, that the kit and more than 10,000 others were submitted for DNA testing, a process that took several years. In 2017, a DNA profile developed from the rape kit was linked to James Chad-Lewis Clay because his DNA profile was in the FBI's DNA database due to a prior conviction for possession of a stolen vehicle. Detroit police showed the rape victim, who was in her 30s, a photographic lineup that included a photograph of Clay as an adult. She was unable to identify Clay. When police questioned Clay, he denied attacking the woman. When he was shown a recent photograph of the woman taken in 2015–18 years after the attack—he denied knowing her. "I never seen her," Clay said. "I do not know her. I never saw her a day in my life." When he was informed that his DNA had been identified in the rape kit, he became angry. "That's impossible," he declared. "This is crazy... I never dated her. I don't know her." On August 4, 2017, he was charged with first-degree criminal sexual conduct. Not long after, the woman learned that Clay's full name was James Chad-Lewis Clay. She told police that she had a boyfriend in high school whom she knew as Chad, and that they had been sexually involved at the time. She told police that she met him through a friend named Dion who was five feet, two inches tall, had green eyes, and played on the high school basketball team. She said that she and Chad would often skip school and stay at Chad's aunt's house. She said also she had a scar on her arm. When police questioned Clay about the woman's statements, he said he lived with his mother and denied having sex with a girl with the woman's first name or a girl with a scar on her arm. He denied knowing anyone named Dion. And he said nothing about staying at his aunt's house—a fact he later attributed to being in shock because of the accusation. During a court hearing prior to trial, Clay suddenly recalled the woman and that they had a sexual relationship 20 years earlier. However, during trial in November 2017 in Wayne County Circuit Court, the woman said she did not recall Clay or having consensual sex with him. The prosecution presented the evidence that Clay's DNA was found in the rape kit. There was additional DNA present that was not identified due to the size of the sample. On November 12, 2017, based solely on the DNA evidence, the jury convicted Clay of first-degree criminal sexual conduct. He was sentenced to 25 to 50 years in prison. While his case was on appeal, Clay's mother reached out to Steven Crane, of ACS Investigations, a private investigation firm in West Bloomfield, Michigan, to re-investigate the case. At the time, Crane was working on an investigation for Clay's cellmate, who suggested Clay contact Crane. In 2019, Crane obtained a photograph of Clay when he was a teenager and showed it to the victim. She identified the photograph as that of a boyfriend named Chad with whom she had a consensual sexual relationship. When Crane showed her a photograph of Clay as an adult, she said that was the man who raped her, based on seeing him in court. Informed that the photos were of the same person, the woman subsequently provided a statement saying, "The James Clay that is in prison for my rape was my boyfriend in high school who went by the name Chad." Crane also located Dyeon McIntyre, who had green eyes and confirmed that he knew the victim and "Chad." He said he played basketball during high school, although on playgrounds. Shown a photograph of Clay as an adult, he identified it as "Chad." When Crane provided the results of his investigation to Clay's appellate attorney, Melvin Houston, he declined to accept it or review it, according to Crane. As a result, Crane reached out to the Michigan State Appellate Defenders Office and subsequently an investigator from that office was assigned to work with Houston. When Crane couldn't get anyone to indicate that they were moving forward on a review of the case, he passed his information to reporter Elisha Anderson at the Detroit Free Press newspaper, and she began reinvestigating the case. On July 19, 2019, Anderson published a detailed account of the case that included interviews with the woman in which she confirmed what she told Crane as well as an interview with McIntyre. Clay's aunt told Anderson that she had a home near where the victim lived and that "Chad was in and out of my house all the time." A day earlier, the Wayne County prosecutor's office and Houston had filed a joint motion with the Michigan Court of Appeals seeking to release Clay. A spokeswoman for the prosecutor's office said, "When we were informed by the Free Press of the identity issue in the case (the prosecutor's office) immediately began an investigation. It should be completed in the near future." "Based upon our findings so far, we have determined that it is in the best interests of justice to move the court to have Mr. Clay immediately released on a personal recognizance bond until the investigation concludes." On July 23, 2019, Clay was released from prison. On August 31, 2019, Wayne County Circuit Court Judge Wanda Evans dismissed the case. | | | | |
| 1998 | Jarrett M. Adams | Assault | Wisconsin | 28 Years | 9 years | Yes |
| 1998 | Jarrett M. Adams | Adams was wrongfully convicted at age 17 following a trial in which his court-appointed attorney presented no witnesses on his behalf. With the assistance of the Wisconsin Innocence Project, the Seventh Circuit United States Court of Appeals unanimously overturned his conviction in 2006 on grounds of ineffective assistance of counsel. All charges were dismissed in February 2007. Adams later earned his J.D. from Loyola University Chicago School of Law and became the first exoneree ever hired as a staff attorney by the Innocence Project. | | | | |
| Feb 17, 1998 | William Avery | Murder | Milwaukee, Wisconsin | 40 years | Five years | Yes |
| Feb 17, 1998 | William Avery | Drug dealer William Avery was suspected in the strangulation of sex worker Maryetta Griffin after it was revealed that she had visited his crack house on the day of her murder. Police claimed that Avery had admitted to attacking Griffin earlier that day, which Avery denied. He was sentenced to 10 years in prison on drug charges. While Avery was serving his sentence, a jailhouse informer claimed that he had confessed to the killing and he was sentenced to 40 years for reckless homicide in 2005. In 2010, DNA testing linked Walter E. Ellis to seven murders of sex workers in Milwaukee during the same time period. DNA evidence from Maryetta Griffin's murder was retested and Ellis was proven to be the killer. Avery's conviction was vacated and he was released from prison. | | | | |
| Jun 7, 1998 | Clarence Elkins | Murder and rape | Barberton, Ohio | Life imprisonment | 6.5 years | Yes |
| Jun 7, 1998 | Clarence Elkins | Judith Johnson was beaten, raped and murdered while her 6-year-old granddaughter, Brooke, was staying at her house. Brooke was also beaten and raped, but survived. She told police that the killer "looked like Uncle Clarence". He was convicted on the basis of this identification. She later explained that she meant the killer resembled him, rather than being a positive identification and she felt pressured to testify against him at trial by the prosecutor. DNA testing performed after conviction from semen found on the victims excluded Elkins, but his appeal was denied. Elkins' wife, who is Judith's daughter, solved the case through her research. She identified Earl Mann, Johnson's neighbor, as a likely suspect. Elkins, who was in prison with Mann at the time, collected a cigarette butt from Mann. It was a match. | | | | |
| 1998 | Luis Vargas | Sexual assault, kidnapping | Los Angeles, California | 55 years | 16 years | Yes |
| Jan 29, 1999 | David Gecht, Richard Kwil | Murder | Chicago, Illinois | Varied | Varied | Yes |
| Jan 29, 1999 | David Gecht, Richard Kwil | In March 1999, 18-year-old David Gecht, 19-year-old Richard Kwil and 27-year-old Ruben Hernandez were charged with first-degree murder for the gang-related killing of Roberto Cruz, 35, on January 29, 1999, in northwest Chicago. On March 23, 2000, Gecht, Kwil, and Hernandez were convicted of first-degree murder and sentenced to 45, 30 and 60 years in prison. They were among more than 40 men and women who were wrongly convicted based on misconduct by Chicago police detective Reynaldo Guevara and his partner, Ernest Halvorsen. In 2022 the prosecution dismissed the case against Gecht, and he was released. Kwil's conviction was vacated and he was released in 2023. Both filed a federal civil rights lawsuit against the city of Chicago, Cook County, Guevara and others seeking compensation for their wrongful conviction. | | | | |
| May 1999 | Brandy Briggs | Child abuse* | Harris County, Texas | 17 years | 6 years | Yes |
| May 1999 | Brandy Briggs | In May 1999, Brandy Briggs called 911 to report that her 2-month-old baby Daniel Lemons was unresponsive. Daniel was rushed to the hospital and died in Brandy's arms. The medical examiner declared the cause of death to be Shaken Baby Syndrome (SBS) caused by Brandi violently shaking the baby. Brandy was subsequently arrested and charged with first-degree felony injury to a child. After being coaxed into taking a plea deal by her attorney, who told her that she would receive probation, Brandy was sentenced to 17 years in prison. However, two pediatricians hired by Brandy's appellate lawyers found that the cause of death was actually a urinary tract infection. A new medical examiner also discovered that doctors inserted the breathing tube into the baby's stomach instead of his lung, depriving him of oxygen for 40 minutes and causing asphyxia. In 2005, an appeals court vacated Brandy's conviction, and in 2006, the prosecution dismissed the case. | | | | |
| July 1999 | Tulia 47 | Delivery of a controlled substance* | Tulia, Texas | Up to 99 years | Up to 6 years | Yes |
| July 1999 | Tulia 47 | Undercover Officer Tom Colman conducted a sting operation that led to forty-seven (Note: Although the book titled Tulia: Race, Cocaine, and Corruption in a Small Texas Town by Nate Blakeslee quotes the number of arrested as forty-seven (with names given), there are other books that quote the number at forty-six (Without names).) citizens accused of dealing cocaine, equating to ten to twenty percent of the African American population being incarcerated. Despite being tried, convicted, and sentenced to decades in prison, a group of attorneys led by Amarillo civil rights attorney Jeff Blackburn and Vanita Gupta from the NAACP Legal Defense and Educational Fund, ultimately succeeded in having the defendants released. In 2003 Texas Governor Rick Perry granted full pardons to thirty-five of the Tulia defendants. In 2005, Colman was convicted of perjury and sentenced to 10 years' probation and a $7,500 fine. | | | | |

== 2000s ==
| Date of crime | Defendant(s) | Crime | Location | Sentence | Time served | Legally exonerated |
|---|---|---|---|---|---|---|
| Feb 2000 | Jane Dorotik | Murder | San Diego, California | Life imprisonment | 20 years | Yes |
| Feb 2000 | Jane Dorotik | In February 2000, Jane Dorotik's husband, Robert, went out for a jog while she worked on their horse ranch. The next day, Robert was found bludgeoned to death on the side of the road. Despite the fact that four witnesses saw Robert out jogging, and one reported seeing him slumped over in a car between two men, police immediately focused on Jane as the suspect. Just two days after the discovery of Robert's body, Jane was arrested and charged with first degree murder. The prosecution claimed that blood and DNA evidence demonstrated that Jane bludgeoned Robert to death in their bedroom, carried him down the stairs, put him in the truck and dumped him on the side of the road. They cited her motive as an unwillingness to pay alimony in the event of a divorce, despite the fact that Jane and Robert had no plans of divorcing. In August 2001, Jane was convicted and sentenced to 25 years to life in prison. In 2015, a judge granted Jane's request for DNA testing. The testing later found foreign male DNA underneath Robert's fingertips and on the murder weapon, excluding Jane as a suspect. Her lawyers additionally discovered that the so-called blood evidence in the bedroom was never actually tested and that two of the lab workers involved in the case had a history of testing errors. In 2020, in light of the new evidence, Jane's murder conviction was overturned, and in 2022, prosecutors dismissed the case. | | | | |
| Jun 15, 2000 | Paul Shane Garrett | Murder | Nashville, Tennessee | 15 years | 10 years | Yes |
| Jun 15, 2000 | Paul Shane Garrett | Garrett was arrested for killing Velma Tharpe, a sex worker found dead in northern Nashville. Much of his 2003 conviction relied on unrecorded confessions, but Garrett stated that they were coerced and that he had told officers almost fifty times that he was not the killer. After being released in 2011, his conviction was vacated in 2021, and Garrett sued the city, receiving a $1.2 million settlement. A different suspect was arrested for the murder, who DNA evidence tied to the scene. | | | | |
| Sep 28, 2000 | David Camm | Murder | Georgetown, Indiana | Life imprisonment | 13 years | Yes |
| Sep 28, 2000 | David Camm | David Camm was convicted twice for the murders of his wife Kim and two children, Brad and Jill. The key evidence against Camm was testimony regarding blood spatter patterns on his tee shirt. It was later discovered that one of the key prosecution witnesses, a blood spatter analyst whose findings had triggered the arrest, had falsified his credentials. He had testified at trial that he was a college professor in the process of getting his PhD. It was later uncovered that he had no affiliation to the university, had no training in blood spatter or crime scene analysis, and had never worked a single case prior to the Camm family murders. In 2013, he testified for the defense, explaining that he worked as an office assistant for a crime scene analyst and had been sent to the crime scene to take photos when he began voicing his opinions on the evidence. He claims the prosecutor, Stan Faith, fabricated the credentials for the trial. A new suspect emerged when the defense compelled the prosecution to run DNA evidence found on a sweatshirt on the floor of the crime scene through CODIS a second time. It was discovered that the DNA was never run through CODIS despite the fact that Faith had assured Camm's defense team that it had been run and it returned no matches. The sweatshirt contained the DNA, prison nickname, and department of corrections number of Charles Boney, a convicted felon with a history of stalking and attacking women. He was on parole at the time for the attempted kidnapping of several college students from their apartment. Investigators had looked for Camm's DNA on the sweatshirt, but failed to investigate any other leads. A DNA analyst who worked on the case filed a complaint alleging that the prosecutor attempted to get her to testify that the foreign DNA sample was Camm's DNA. A fingerprint analyst who found Boney's prints testified to a similar interaction. The prosecutor was later discovered to be Boney's defense attorney as well as a personal family friend, and they admitted discussing the case prior to Boney becoming a suspect. Faith asserts this is coincidental and he did not know Boney was involved. | | | | |
| May 1, 2001 | Ingmar Guandique | Murder of Chandra Levy | Washington, D.C. | 60 years | 5 years | Yes |
| May 1, 2001 | Ingmar Guandique | Chandra Levy was reported missing in May 2001 and found dead in Rock Creek Park the following year. In 2009 police charged Ingmar Guandique, an illegal immigrant who was convicted of attacking two women in the park just after Levy disappeared, with Levy's murder. He had allegedly told fellow prisoner Armando Morales that he killed Levy after trying to rob her while she was out jogging in the park. Guandique's cellmate testified that the alleged confession never happened but Guandique was convicted on November 22, 2010 and jailed for 60 years in February 2011. After his conviction it was discovered that Morales had lied on the stand when he denied being a career informant, and witness testimony suggested that Levy had been attacked in her apartment and her body dumped in the park later, which contradicted Guandique's supposed confession. Guandique was granted a new trial in 2015; however, before the case could go to trial the prosecution was given a recording by Morales' neighbour in which Morales admitted that Guandique never confessed. The charges against Guandique were dropped in July 2016, and he was deported to El Salvador. | | | | |
| Jul 8, 2001 | Kirstin Lobato | Murder | Las Vegas, Nevada | 40–100 years | 16 years | Yes |
| Jul 8, 2001 | Kirstin Lobato | In May 2001, Lobato, then 18, was staying at a residential motel in Las Vegas when she was allegedly attacked by a black man who "smelled like alcohol and dirty diapers." She was able to escape after she pulled out a knife and slashed the man's groin. Lobato was addicted to meth and had not slept for three days at the time of the attack, so she did not report the event to police, but she did tell friends. One of the friends who heard Lobato's story told a teacher who notified police. In July, a homeless man named Duran Bailey was found murdered on the other side of town. His penis had been severed. Although Lobato told friends about her attack prior to Bailey's murder and she had an alibi for the time of the murder, police suspected Lobato to be his killer. Police confronted her about the attack and she tearfully told them details. At the end of the interview, she was informed that she killed the man who attacked her and she was charged with murder. This "confession" would serve as key evidence against her. It wasn't until after her arrest that she discovered that the man whose murder she was charged with wasn't the man who attacked her. In 2017, her defense team convinced the appellate court that had the jury heard the strong entomological evidence pinpointing of Bailey's time of death coupled with her alibi witnesses placing her in Panaca, Nevada, they would have acquitted. Lobato's conviction was overturned. The district attorney took the further step of asking a judge to dismiss the case with prejudice, a move that bars her from ever being prosecuted for the crime. | | | | |
| Sep 11, 2001 | Cal Harris | Murder | Spencer, New York | Life imprisonment | 8 years | Yes |
| Sep 11, 2001 | Cal Harris | Michele Anne Harris was in the process of divorcing her husband Cal when she disappeared on September 11, 2001, after leaving her boyfriend Brian Earley's house. She has never been seen since, although her car was found abandoned at the end of the Harris' driveway. Cal quickly became the police's prime suspect after it came to light that he had threatened to kill Michele and 10 bloodstains belonging to Michele were found in the garage. Cal claimed Michele had cut herself the month before and the stains appeared to be of varying ages and had not been closely examined by the states' expert. Investigators also found the fingerprints of an unidentified person who was not Cal or Michele in Michele's car. Cal was eventually convicted of Michele's murder in 2007 although her body was never found; however, before he could be sentenced two witnesses came forward who had seen Michele alive after she disappeared and implicated another man in her disappearance (one of these witnesses died before he could testify at trial). Cal was given a new trial but was convicted again, only to be given a third trial three years later due to juror misconduct. At his third trial, the man witnesses had seen with Michele was identified as her acquaintance Stacy Stewart, and significant circumstantial evidence was found implicating Stewart in Michele's murder. Cal's third trial failed to reach a verdict and he was given a bench trial in 2016, where he was found not guilty. | | | | |
| Sep 16, 2001 | Ali Al-Tamimi | Treason* | Fairfax, Virginia | Life without parole | 15 years | Yes |
| Sep 16, 2001 | Ali Al-Tamimi | Al-Tamimi, a Virginia-based Imam, was charged with soliciting treason in the aftermath of the September 11 attacks. Prosecutors alleged that he was the spiritual leader of the Virginia Jihad Network and that he encouraged his followers to go to Afghanistan to fight for the Taliban against the United States. Al-Tamimi was convicted in 2005 and sentenced to life without parole, but released to home confinement after 15 years due to the COVID-19 pandemic. Three of the ten counts he was convicted on were overturned in 2024 by Judge Leonie Brinkema, who ruled that the charges were too vague. In January 2026, Al-Tamimi's conviction was fully overturned by the Fourth Circuit court, which ruled that there was no evidence he had committed a crime and he was convicted for legally exercising his freedom of speech. | | | | |
| Sep 17, 2001 | Abdel-Ilah Elmardoudi, Karim Koubriti, Ahmed Hannan | Terrorism* | Detroit, Michigan | Varied | One year | Yes |
| Sep 17, 2001 | Abdel-Ilah Elmardoudi, Karim Koubriti, Ahmed Hannan | Days after the September 11 attacks, the FBI arrested five North African Muslims - Abdel-Ilah Elmardoudi, Karim Koubriti, Ahmed Hannan, Farouk Ali-Haimoud, and Youssef Hmimmssa - on suspicion of using false visa documents. Hmimmssa later told the FBI that the other four had tried to recruit him into an Al-Qaeda sleeper cell and had plotted bomb attacks on several different locations. Prosecutors also alleged at the 2003 trial that a number of sketches found in the defendant's possession showed the intended targets of their attacks. Elmardoudi and Koubriti were convicted of supporting terrorism, while Hannan was convicted only of documents fraud; Ali-Haimoud was acquitted of all charges. After the trial, it came to light that Hmimmssa had admitted to fabricating the terror plot in order to reduce his charges for visa fraud, which the prosecution had withheld from the defence. All three men had their convictions set aside in September 2004 due to multiple violations of due process by the prosecution. | | | | |
| Nov 1, 2001 | Ryan Ferguson | Murder | Columbia, Missouri | 40 years | 9 years, 8 months | Yes |
| Nov 1, 2001 | Ryan Ferguson | Ferguson, who was 17 at the time of the murder of Kent Heitholt, was convicted on the basis of a friend's confession to police claiming he and Ferguson killed Heitholt for drinking money. His friend, Charles Erickson, had mental health issues and substance abuse issues at the time and initially claimed to have no memory of the evening. Ferguson's conviction was overturned on November 5, 2013, after it was uncovered that the prosecution withheld exculpatory evidence and the witnesses who testified against him recanted their testimony. Erickson remains incarcerated, but Ferguson has vowed to work to get him released. | | | | |
| Nov 27, 2001 | Termaine Hicks | Rape | Philadelphia, Pennsylvania | 25 years | 18 years | Yes |
| Nov 27, 2001 | Termaine Hicks | Hicks was walking to a corner store when he heard a woman screaming for help after she was sexually assaulted. Hicks entered the alley where the victim was, but shortly after police arrived and shot him from behind, mistaking his cell phone for a weapon. Even though the victim could not definitively identify her rapist, Hicks was charged and convicted a year later. His conviction was overturned in 2020, and a federal jury awarded him $3 million in 2025. | | | | |
| 2002 | Melinda Bronson | Child sexual abuse* | Queens, New York | Probation, lifetime on sex offender registry | 9 years on registry | Yes |
| 2002 | Melinda Bronson | After being placed into the custody of his alcoholic father, 11-year-old A.R. accused his mother, Melinda Bronson, of fondling him. Melinda was charged with sexual abuse and endangering the welfare of a child, and in February 2002, sentenced to probation and required to register as a sex offender. She was consequently unable to obtain any work as a teacher. After his father died in 2007, A.R., now an adult, revealed that his father constantly disparaged his mother in front of him and coerced him into falsely accusing her of sexual abuse. In light of his revelations, a court reversed Melinda's conviction, and the prosecution dismissed the case. | | | | |
| 2002 | Brian Banks | Rape* | Long Beach, California | 6 years | 5 years | Yes |
| 2002 | Brian Banks | Brian Banks was a student at Long Beach Polytechnic High School when a fellow student, Wanetta Gibson, accused him of rape. He accepted a plea deal to avoid a lengthy sentence and ended up serving almost the entire sentence. The accuser was later recorded admitting that the sexual contact was consensual and that she made up the allegation so her mother wouldn't find out she was sexually active. Gibson's family had received a $1.5 million settlement from the school following Banks' guilty plea for failing to keep Wanetta safe. | | | | |
| April 17, 2003 | Frances Choy | Murder and arson | Brockton, Massachusetts | Life imprisonment | 17 years | Yes |
| April 17, 2003 | Frances Choy | In 2003, a fire at a home in Massachusetts killed Anne and Jimmy Choy, the parents of 17-year-old Frances Choy. Frances and Kenneth Choy, her 16-year-old nephew, were charged with setting the fire. Notes describing plans to set the house on fire were found near Kenneth's bed, but he claimed Frances had forced him to write them. He was found not guilty and left for Hong Kong before Frances' third trial began. Prosecutors alleged Frances Choy's sweatpants had traces of gasoline on them, but an analytical chemist hired by her legal team found that there was no gasoline residue on them. She was found guilty and sentenced to life in prison. In 2020, a judge vacated her conviction after Choy's lawyers found evidence that Kenneth had been the one who set the fire. The judge also ruled that emails written by prosecutors had shown "racial animus against Frances and her family." Choy and her family were Chinese American. | | | | |
| May 11, 2003 | Tyler Edmonds | Murder | Longview, Mississippi | Life imprisonment | Four years | Yes |
| May 11, 2003 | Tyler Edmonds | When Edmonds was 13, his half-sister Kristi Fulgham murdered her husband Joey in his sleep. She then pressured Edmonds to confess to the crime, telling him that she would get the death penalty if convicted but he would be spared due to his young age. Edmonds ultimately told the police that the two of them pulled the trigger together. He recanted his confession, maintaining that Fulgham had acted alone, but both of them were convicted of the murder. Edmonds was given a new trial in 2007 after the court ruled that a forensic expert's testimony purportedly supporting Edmonds' confession was unreliable and should not have been admitted, and a jury found him not guilty the following year. | | | | |
| Oct 2003 | Julie Baumer | Child abuse* | Macomb, Michigan | 10–15 years | 5 years | Yes |
| Oct 2003 | Julie Baumer | In October 2003, Julie Baumer took her ill 6-week-old nephew to the hospital. After doctors discovered a skull fracture, Julie was charged with first-degree murder. At her trial, one doctor identified the cause of death as blunt force trauma, while the other cited Shaken Baby Syndrome (SBS) caused by Julie violently shaking the baby. Julie was convicted of first-degree child abuse and sentenced to 10–15 years in prison. In 2009, Julie was granted a new trial due to ineffective legal counsel. At her second trial, defense experts testified that the baby was actually suffering from Venuous Sinus Thrombosis. The jury acquitted Julie of all charges. | | | | |
| Mar 2004 | Melonie Ware | Murder* | DeKalb County, Georgia | Life without parole | 4 years | Yes |
| Mar 2004 | Melonie Ware | In March 2004, babysitter Melonie Ware called 911 to report that 9-month-old Jaden Paige was unresponsive. The infant was rushed to the hospital and died shortly thereafter. The police subjected Melonie to a lengthy interrogation, and that same night, charged her with murder. At her trial, medical examiner Gerald Gowitt attributed the death to Shaken Baby Syndrome (SBS) caused by Melonie violently shaking Jaden. In November 2005, Melonie was convicted of felony murder and sentenced to life in prison. In 2006, an appeals court vacated Melonie's conviction due to ineffective legal counsel and granted her a new trial. At Melonie's second trial, defense experts showed that Jaden actually died from sickle cell anemia and explained that his injuries were due to the disease and the hospital's failed resuscitation attempts. The jury acquitted Melonie of the charges. | | | | |
| Aug 2004 | Richard and Megan Winfrey | Murder | San Jacinto County, Texas | Life imprisonment | 2–5 years | Yes |
| Aug 2004 | Richard and Megan Winfrey | In August 2004, high school custodian Murray Burr was found stabbed to death in his trailer. Police set their sights on Richard Winfrey Sr. and his two children, 16-year-old Megan and 17-year-old Richard Jr., after a neighbor said that they frequently visited Burr's trailer. Absent any physical evidence, police brought in self-trained dog handler Keith Pikett, who claimed that his bloodhounds could identify suspects through scent lineups. In one such lineup, Pikett claimed that his dogs identified all three Winfreys as suspects, who were subsequently arrested and charged with first-degree murder. At Megan's trial, prosecutors alleged that she shaved her pubic hair to destroy evidence, and some of her teachers even testified against her. Megan was found guilty and sentenced to life in prison, while Richard Sr. was sentenced to 75 years and Richard Jr. was acquitted. In 2010, The Texas Court of Criminal Appeals declared the dog scent evidence to be insufficient and acquitted Richard Sr. The appeals court acquitted Megan in 2013. | | | | |
| Dec 24, 2004 | Sheldon Thomas | Murder | New York City, New York | Life imprisonment | 19 years | Yes |
| Dec 24, 2004 | Sheldon Thomas | Police arrested three people for the shooting death of 14-year-old Anderson Bercy. When detectives showed an eyewitness a photo of Sheldon Thomas, they used a picture of a different man with the same name. The witness identified Thomas, not knowing it was a different person than the Sheldon Thomas they believed it was. Thomas was convicted, while the other two defendants had their charges dismissed. In 2023 Thomas' conviction was overturned and his indictment vacated. | | | | |
| Apr 2005 | Richard Gagnon | Murder | Conway, South Carolina | Life imprisonment | 8 years | Yes |
| Apr 2005 | Richard Gagnon | Convicted of murder in the deaths of Diane and Charles Parker Sr., both found shot to death April 12, 2005. In 2009 DNA evidence showed Bruce Antwain Hill was guilty. | | | | |
| 2005 | Lamar Johnson | Murder | Baltimore, Maryland | Life imprisonment | 13 years | Yes |
| 2005 | Lamar Johnson | Lamar Johnson was potentially wrongly identified as the suspect in the murder of Carlos Sawyer following a 911 tip that the assailant had a particular nickname: "Boo Boo." This tip came hours after the fatal attack. Police followed the lead and found Lamar Johnson, who at the time was incorrectly identified by this nickname. At the end of the trial in 2005, Johnson was found guilty and sentenced to life in prison. There was no physical evidence that connected Johnson nor a clear motive for the crime provided by the prosecution. Eyewitnesses testified that Johnson "looked like" the gunman. In 2008, Lamar Johnson began filing with the court of appeals to overturn his conviction. The Mid-Atlantic Innocence Project (MAIP), a subset of the Innocence Network, picked up Johnson's case and began re-investigating. This process found new eyewitnesses that had originally not been interviewed or seen as important. The MAIP team also re-tested physical evidence used in the original case and visited the crime scene multiple times. On September 19, 2017, Lamar Johnson's case was reviewed in a writ of actual innocence hearing. | | | | |
| May 2005 | Nicole Harris | Murder* | Chicago, Illinois | 30 years | 8 years | Yes |
| May 2005 | Nicole Harris | In May 2005, 23-year-old Nicole Harris and her husband, Sta-Von Dancy, called 911 to report that their 4-year-old son Jaquari Dancy accidentally suffocated himself with an elastic band from his bedsheet. The boy was later pronounced dead, and the medical examiner ruled the death accidental. However, police zeroed in on Nicole as the culprit and subjected her to a lengthy and aggressive 27-hour interrogation, after which she confessed to strangling the boy. At her trial, Nicole testified that her confession was coerced but was ultimately found guilty and sentenced to 30 years in prison. In 2012, an appeals court reversed Harris' conviction, primarily due to the judge improperly barring the testimony of Jaquari's brother, who said that Jaquari liked to play Spider-Man by wrapping the band around his neck and jumping off the bed. In February 2013, Nicole was released, and in June, prosecutors dismissed the case. | | | | |
| Jun 2005 | Hamid Hayat | Terrorism* | California | 24 years | 13 years | Yes |
| Jun 2005 | Hamid Hayat | Hamid Hayat, a Pakistani-American, and his father Umer were among the defendants in the first terrorism trial in the state of California. They had been arrested in 2005 after returning from a two-year trip to Pakistan, where they had allegedly trained at a jihadist camp and made plans to attack civilian targets in the United States. The case against them was mostly based on their confessions to the FBI, which a judge later found to be coerced. Of the five defendants, Hamid Hayat was the only one to be convicted on terrorism charges. His conviction was overturned in 2019 due to ineffective defense, as his trial lawyer had failed to call witnesses from Pakistan who could have testified that Hayat had never left the village he was staying in long enough to have attended the jihadist camp. All charges were dismissed the following year. | | | | |
| Jan 7, 2006 | Adam Braseel | Murder | Tracy City, Tennessee | Life imprisonment | 12 years | Yes |
| Jan 7, 2006 | Adam Braseel | 60-year-old Malcolm Burrows left his home with a red-haired man who had knocked on his door claiming his car had broken down. The man returned to the home 30 minutes later to attack Burrows' sister, but was chased away by her son. Burrows' body was later found in nearby woodland. Adam Braseel became a suspect after a car similar to his was seen near the crime scene, and Burrows' sister and nephew both identified him as their attacker. The motive was alleged to be robbery, as Burrows' wallet with $800 inside was said to be missing from his body. However, after Braseel's conviction, a deputy revealed that a wallet had been found on Burrows' body but had disappeared from evidence. Braseel's lawyers also found that a witness statement had been altered to make the description of the killer sound more like Braseel. Braseel appealed based on official misconduct, and during the appeals process it was revealed that fingerprints belonging to Kermit Bryson, a murderer who died by suicide in 2018 and was said to resemble Braseel, had been found at the crime scene. Braseel agreed to plead no contest in 2019 in return for being released from prison, and was exonerated two years later when Governor Bill Lee pardoned him. | | | | |
| Jan 2006 | Tammy Smith | Child abuse* | Humboldt, Iowa | 10 years | 4 years | Yes |
| Jan 2006 | Tammy Smith | In January 2006, 32-year-old Tammy Smith discovered that her 4-year-old son Gabriel had broken his arm and took him to the hospital. Gabriel was developmentally disabled and unable to talk, but Tammy believed that he stuck his arm in the washing machine, which was in poor condition and did not stop when opened. However, police believed that Tammy deliberately broke his arm and charged her with child endangerment causing serious injury. In June 2007, Tammy was convicted and sentenced to 10 years in prison. After her appeal was denied, Tammy filed a motion for a new trial due to ineffective legal counsel, claiming that her attorney failed to pursue the washing machine theory out of fear that the broken washing machine would constitute evidence of neglect. In addition, Gabriel, now a 9-year-old with improved verbal skills, testified that he did in fact break his arm in the washing machine. The judge denied the motion, but an appeals court reversed the lower court's decision and ordered a new trial, and in September 2011, prosecutors dismissed the case. | | | | |
| Apr 2007 | Susan King | Manslaughter | Spencer County, Kentucky | 10 years | 6 years | Yes |
| Apr 2007 | Susan King | In April 2007, Susan King was charged with the unsolved murder of her ex-boyfriend, Kyle Breeden, who was found shot to death in the Kentucky River several years prior. Despite the fact that Susan was a 97-pound amputee, state police officer Todd Harwood believed that she carried his 200-pound body to the Kentucky River, hoisted it over the railing and threw him into the river. In September 2008, King entered an Alford plea to second-degree manslaughter and was sentenced to 10 years in prison. But in May 2012, a man named Richard Jarrell confessed to murdering Breeden after the latter stole money from him, in exchange for leniency for his brother who was facing federal drug charges. Despite Jarrell's confession, a court denied Susan's motion to vacate her guilty plea. However, in July 2014, an appeals court reversed the lower court's decision, and in October, the prosecution dismissed the case. | | | | |
| Nov 8, 2007 | Raymond McCann | Perjury* | Constantine, Michigan | 22 months to 22 years | 1 year, 8 months | Yes |
| Nov 8, 2007 | Raymond McCann | Ray McCann, a former reserve police officer, had been implicated in the abduction, rape and murder of Jodi Parrack, an 11-year-old girl and fifth-grade student at Riverside Elementary School. Following Jodi's disappearance, an intensive search was launched to find her, and McCann suggested searching in a local cemetery, where Parrack was found. McCann insisted that his suggestion was based on his intuition and experience as a law enforcement official, and his deductions about the probable locations where a kidnapper might have deposited her after a violent crime. However, officials were surprised at the accuracy of McCann's directions and began to suspect that he might have been responsible himself. They later claimed inconsistencies from McCann's police interrogations, and an apparent contradiction in McCann's own claim that he had walked near a creamery while searching for Jodi, an image that was not captured by local CCTV cameras. But McCann later stated that the interrogations were aggressive and incorporated known deceptions, including claims of forensic evidence in the form of matching DNA, a practice allowed by the United States Supreme Court in its ruling in Frazier v. Cupp, and that the camera angle could not have detected whether he was present at the location near the creamery. McCann was nonetheless charged with 5 counts of perjury, and fearing his ability to defend against them, he pleaded no contest to one of them. The key break in the case came in 2015 when the actual perpetrator of the crime, Daniel K. Furlong, was arrested following an attempt on another local girl. He confessed to the abduction, sexual assault and murder of Jodi Parrack. McCann then pressed his case for dismissal of his charges and overturning of his perjury conviction, and he was fully exonerated by a subsequent court upon review. | | | | |
| Aug 21, 2008 | Stephanie Spurgeon | Manslaughter* | Palm Harbor, Florida | 20 years | 8.5 years | Yes |
| Aug 21, 2008 | Stephanie Spurgeon | In August 2008, 37-year-old Stephanie Spurgeon, a long-time home daycare provider, received a new 1-year-old child, Maria Harris. After Maria was picked up from daycare, she fell ill and later died from a brain hemorrhage. Despite the fact that Maria had no external injuries, doctors claimed the hemorrhage was caused by abuse. Stephanie was promptly arrested and charged with first-degree murder. At the trial, prosecutors attempted to explain away the absence of visible injuries by claiming that Stephanie threw the child against a mattress. Stephanie was convicted of manslaughter and sentenced to 20 years in prison. In 2018, Stephanie was granted an evidentiary hearing, in which her defense attorneys presented medical evidence that Maria was suffering from undiagnosed diabetes. Tests showed that Maria's blood glucose was more than four times the normal level and that she had developed a blood clot in her brain. Additionally, an expert testified that her brain injuries could not have been caused by falling onto a mattress. In light of the evidence presented, the judge overturned Stephanie's conviction and granted her a new trial. Prosecutors later dismissed the charges. | | | | |
| Sep 21, 2008 | Adrian P. Thomas | Murder* | Troy, New York | 25 years to life in prison | 6 years | Yes |
| Sep 21, 2008 | Adrian P. Thomas | Four-month-old Matthew Thomas was rushed to the hospital by his father, Adrian Thomas, after finding him unresponsive. During the interrogation, investigators told him that it had been proven the child died from blunt force trauma and that they knew someone in the household had done it. They threatened to arrest his wife if he did not confess. He was convicted on the basis of his confession. It was later determined that the cause of death was sepsis. | | | | |

== 2010s ==
| Date of crime | Defendant(s) | Crime | Location | Sentence | Time served | Legally exonerated |
|---|---|---|---|---|---|---|
| July 2010 | Deron Parks | Rape* | Vancouver, Washington | Life imprisonment | 8 years, 8 months | Yes |
| March 18 – April 25, 2010 | Patrick McAllister | Rape and assault* | Brinnon, Washington | 20 years, 10 months | 5 years, 6 months | Yes |
| 2010 | Eric Anderson | Robbery, assault, illegal use of a weapon | Detroit, Michigan | 15 to 22 years | 8 years and 6 months | Yes |
| 2011 | Otis Boone | Robbery | Brooklyn, New York | 25 years | 7 years | Yes |
| 2011 | Livingston Broomes | Rape | Brooklyn, New York | 4 years | 2 years | Yes |
| May 30, 2011 | Jennifer Weathington and Elgerie Cash | Murder, assault, illegal use of a weapon* | Dallas, Georgia | Life imprisonment | 5 years, 6 months | Yes |
| 2011 | Matthew Ngov | Murder | Los Angeles, California | 57 years to life | 5 years, 9 months | Yes |
| Jul 2011 | Heidi Haischer | Fraud | Las Vegas, Nevada | 1 year, 3 months | 1 year, 3 months | Yes |
| Jul 2011 | Heidi Haischer | In July 2011, Heidi Haischer was indicted for allegedly perpetrating a mortgage fraud scheme. Kelly Nunes, Heidi's boyfriend, had concocted the scheme and filled out the documents but forced Heidi to sign them, refusing to take her to the doctor to treat her severe leg injury until she complied. However, the judge blocked evidence of Nunes' abusive and threatening behavior, and in November 2012, Heidi was convicted of conspiracy and wire fraud and sentenced to 15 months in prison. But in March 2015, an appeals court ruled that the evidence was wrongfully barred and vacated Heidi's conviction. At her second trial, the jury acquitted Heidi of all charges. | | | | |
| Aug 2011 | Lydia Salce | Attempted murder* | Saratoga, New York | 16 years | 3 months | Yes |
| Aug 2011 | Lydia Salce | In August 2011, Michael McKee returned home intoxicated from a night out with his motorcycle club and quickly became violent towards his wife, Lydia Salce, hurling a jar at her, grabbing her hair, yanking her head back, holding a knife to her throat and punching her repeatedly. During the beating, Michael accidentally dropped the knife, prompting Lydia to pick it up and stab him in self-defense. Michael, however, asserted that Lydia initiated the assault and he had acted in self-defense. The police sided with Michael and charged Lydia with attempted murder and first-degree assault, and in July 2012, Lydia was convicted and sentenced to 16 years in prison. In January 2015, an appeals court granted Lydia a new trial, ruling that the judge improperly barred a defense expert from testifying, and in May 2015, Lydia was acquitted of the charges. | | | | |
| October 18, 2011 | Herbert Alford | Murder | Lansing, Michigan | 32 years five months to 62 years five months | 3 years in prison | Yes |
| December 22, 2011 | Giovante Douglas and Cartier Hunter | Murder | Oakland, California | Life imprisonment | 10 years | Yes |
| December 22, 2011 | Giovante Douglas and Cartier Hunter | In December 2011 Charles Butler Jr. was fatally shot in Oakland. A homeless woman testified that she witnessed Douglas and Hunter killing Butler, and despite no physical or forensic evidence, the two men were convicted in 2016. In 2021 the witness recanted her testimony and said she was paid $30,000 to testify that she saw the murder. An Oakland homicide detective who worked the case was later charged with several felonies in relation with the trial. | | | | |
| December 27, 2011 | Russ Faria | Murder | Troy, Missouri | Life without parole | 3 years | Yes |
| December 27, 2011 | Russ Faria | Faria discovered his wife Betsy Faria dead from knife wounds and called 911, believing she had committed suicide. After an autopsy found 55 stab wounds, Russ Faria was charged with Betsy's murder. Although four people said Faria had been with them at a regular game night when Betsy was killed, which was backed by cellphone data, the prosecutor accused them of conspiring with Faria. Faria was convicted, largely based on the testimony of Betsy's friend Pam Hupp. In 2016, Hupp was charged with and later convicted of killing Louis Gumpenberger as part of a plot to make it seem as if Faria sent a hitman after her. She was charged with killing Betsy Faria in 2021. The case was depicted in the TV series The Thing About Pam. | | | | |
| Sep 2012 | Jasmine Eskew | Felony assault of a child | Great Falls, Montana | 5 years | 3 years | Yes |
| Sep 2012 | Jasmine Eskew | In September 2012, 21-year-old Jasmine Eskew called 911 to report that her daughter, Brooklynn, was unresponsive. Her boyfriend, Greg Robey, had been taking care of Brooklynn and was seen leaving the scene as paramedics arrived. However, police zeroed in on Jasmine as the prime suspect and took her to the station for a 4-hour interrogation. They promised a sobbing Jasmine that she could see her daughter if she answered their questions correctly and proceeded to accuse her of violently shaking her daughter and demand that she demonstrate her actions on a doll. Jasmine repeatedly denied hurting Brooklynn, but after four hours, she relented and confessed. Jasmine was then arrested and charged with deliberate homicide and felony assault on a minor. The defense argued that Jasmine's confession was coerced and that Robey had in fact struck Brooklynn, noting that his ring matched the hole in Brooklynn's skull. They also attempted to present an expert on false confessions but were denied. In April 2014, Jasmine was convicted of felony assault of a child and sentenced to five years in prison. In February 2017, the Montana Supreme Court reversed Jasmine's conviction and granted her a new trial, holding that the judge improperly blocked testimony from the defense expert, while improperly admitting Jasmine's coerced confession. The next month, prosecutors dismissed the case. | | | | |
| 2012 | Michael Winston | Attempted murder, robbery, assault, kidnapping | Milwaukee, Wisconsin | 26 years | 5 years | Yes |
| 2013 | James Frazier | Murder, other violent felony, conspiracy | Philadelphia, Pennsylvania | Life without parole | 5 years, 8 months | Yes |
| 2013 | James Frazier | On May 14, 2012, 21-year-old Rodney Ramseur and his 21-year-old girlfriend, Latia Jones, were gunned down as they sat on the front porch of their home on West Sparks Street in Philadelphia, Pennsylvania. Jones was shot three times and Ramseur nine times. On June 19, 2012, Philadelphia police detective Philip Nordo, later saying he acted on a tip from an informant named "Nubile", took in 19-year-old James Frazier for questioning. Frazier later said that Nordo sought to cultivate Frazier as a source and to engage in sexual activity. Frazier said that Nordo threatened and intimidated him, including threatening to sexually assault him. These threats resulted in a false confession, Frazier claimed. On September 13, 2013, he was convicted of two counts of third-degree murder, conspiracy, and retaliation. He was sentenced to life in prison without parole. In February 2019, Nordo was indicted on charges of sexually assaulting witnesses and suspects, including once in an interrogation room. On March 5, 2019, Common Pleas Court Judge J. Scott O'Keefe vacated Frazier's convictions. On April 4, 2019, Conviction Integrity Unit chief Patricia Cummings dismissed the charges and Frazier was released. On April 18, 2019, Frazier filed a federal civil rights lawsuit against the city of Philadelphia and Nordo. The lawsuit said that "as early as 2005," the department "was aware of credible complaints that…Nordo, in his role as a Philadelphia police detective, groomed suspects for future sexual relationships. In grooming these suspects…Nordo promised leniency or reward money, used threats and coercion, and engaged in sexual assault." The lawsuit claimed that Nordo "used his position to cause witnesses to sign false or inaccurate interview statements and confessions." In May 2019, Cummings dismissed the 2016 murder conviction of Sherman McCoy, who also falsely confessed during an interrogation by Nordo. | | | | |
| 2013 | Clarens Desrouleaux | Theft | Miami, Florida | 5 years | 4 years | Yes |
| 2013 | Clarens Desrouleaux | Clarens Desrouleaux was arrested on January 23, 2013, and charged with three burglaries that had happened about two weeks earlier in Biscayne Park, Florida, a suburb of Miami. Police had said they focused on him after he was found to have forged and cashed a check stolen from one of the houses. There was no evidence linking him to the other two houses, but officers falsified an arrest affidavit and arrested Desrouleaux, a 35-year-old native of Haiti who had permanent resident status in the United States. He was interrogated, and the officers said he confessed to the three burglaries. The confession was neither written down nor recorded, but the officers would give sworn depositions confirming Desrouleaux's confession. Desrouleaux had previous convictions for drug-dealing and other non-violent crimes. If convicted at trial, he faced being sentenced as a habitual felon and serving 30 years in prison. Instead of taking that risk, he pled guilty on May 23, 2013, to three counts of burglary and three counts of grand theft. He was sentenced to five years in prison. He served four years and was released in 2017, then quickly deported to Haiti. In 2014, Biscayne Park began investigating its police force, after the town manager received a series of anonymous letters complaining about the tactics of Police Chief Raimundo Atesiano. The investigation revealed that the chief told his officers to make false arrests in order to improve the department's closure rate. A few months after Desrouleaux's arrest, Atesiano had boasted to the town council that there were no unsolved property crimes in Biscayne Park. Atesiano and three other police officers were indicted in 2018 and charged with violating the civil rights of Desrouleaux and two other men who had also been falsely arrested. Unlike Desrouleaux, the other two men had their charges dropped before trial. After pleading guilty in U.S. District Court for the Southern District of Florida, each officer received a prison sentence. Atesiano received the longest sentence, three years in prison. "Will somebody please explain to me how Mr. Desrouleaux gets five years, but the guy who framed him for those crimes that he never committed gets less of a sentence?" asked Carlos Martinez, Miami-Dade County's public defender. Desrouleaux's charges were dismissed by the Miami-Dade State Attorney's office on August 10, 2018. On September 18, 2018, Desrouleaux filed suit in U.S. District Court in Miami against Biscayne Park, Atesiano, and the two officers involved with his arrest. Since being deported, he has been unable to return to the United States. | | | | |
| 2013 | Jesus Sanchez | Murder | Wheeling, Illinois | 45 years | 4 years | Yes |
| 2013 | Sherman McCoy | Murder, gun possession or sale, and conspiracy | Philadelphia, Pennsylvania | Life without parole | 2 years, 8 months | Yes |
| 2013 | Greg Kelley | Child sex abuse | Leander, Texas | 25 years | 6 years | Yes |
| 2013 | Greg Kelley | Kelley was the subject of the Outcry, a 2020 Showtime documentary mini-series covering the case. | | | | |
| May 18, 2013 | Shamel Capers | Murder | Queens, New York | Life imprisonment | 8 years | Yes |
| May 18, 2013 | Shamel Capers | 14-year-old D'aja Robinson was killed by a stray bullet from a gang dispute while leaving a party in Jamaica, Queens by bus. Capers was convicted largely by a witness who said he saw Capers fire at the bus, but the witness later told his mother while imprisoned at Rikers Island that he had never actually seen Capers shoot at the bus. In November 2022 Capers' conviction was overturned. | | | | |
| Apr 2014 | Courtney Hayden | Murder* | Corpus Christi, Texas | 40 years | 1 year | Yes |
| Apr 2014 | Courtney Hayden | In April 2014, 24-year-old Courtney Hayden shot 33-year-old Anthony Macias in self-defense after he broke into her home and attempted to rob her. Courtney was already suspected of helping Macias orchestrate a recent robbery, prompting police to believe that she killed him in an argument over the proceeds. Courtney was subsequently charged with murder and aggravated robbery. She pleaded guilty to aggravated robbery and was sentenced to 10 years in prison. During her murder trial, medical examiner Dr. Adel Shaker testified that Macias was shot from a distance of three feet, which prosecutors claimed disputed Courtney's self-defense claim. Courtney was convicted and sentenced to 40 years in prison. In 2017, a judge vacated Courtney's convictions after it was revealed that Shaker initially concluded that Macias was shot at close-range, corroborating Courtney's self-defense claim, but changed his opinion under pressure from the prosecutors. In 2018, Courtney pleaded guilty to aggravated robbery and was sentenced to 12 years in prison. | | | | |
| 2014 | Maurice Hopkins | Sexual assault | Pine Bluff, Arkansas | 12 years, 6 months | 3 years | Yes |
| Sep 2014 | Arthur Morris and Jeanie Becerra | Assault | Topeka, Kansas | Not sentenced | | Yes |
| Sep 2014 | Arthur Morris and Jeanie Becerra | In September 2014, police responded to a 911 call from the home of 34-year-old Arthur Morris and 21-year-old Jeanie Becerra, who denied making a call. Police officer Jeremy Carlisle-Simons proceeded to wrestle Morris to the ground and begin beating him severely. But Carlisle-Simons claimed that Morris and Becerra assaulted him, and both were arrested and charged with assaulting a police officer, disobeying a police order, interfering with law enforcement and disorderly conduct. Based solely on the testimony of the officers, the judge convicted Becerra and Morris of all charges. The very next day, the prosecutor watched body camera footage of the incident, revealing that Carlisle-Simons lied about the assault, prompting him to vacate and dismiss the charges against Morris and Becerra. | | | | |
| 2016 | Tazell Cash | Robbery, other violent felony | Detroit, Michigan | 10–20 years | 2 years | Yes |
| May 2017 | Alex Heineman | Sexual assault* | Hudson, Wisconsin | Unknown | 2 years, 2 months | Partially (Original conviction vacated) |
| May 2017 | Alex Heineman | In May 2017, 16-year-old Alex Heineman was accused of sexually assaulting a 15-year-old girl after both attended an event at the local YMCA. Heineman denied that he assaulted the girl and she refused an exam. The Hudson Police Department charged Heineman with second-degree sexual assault and Heineman pled guilty to third-degree sexual assault on the advice of his public defender. As Heineman was a juvenile at the time, he was required to stay at Eau Claire Academy. Due to incidents there involving an attempted suicide and a fight, Heineman was transferred to the controversial Lincoln Hills School, a juvenile prison. Within a month of entering Lincoln Hills, he was transferred to the Mendota Mental Health Institute after multiple suicide attempts and later ended up in the Eau Claire County Jail. Heineman was later charged with escaping from the Jail due to not returning from work release and instead was found in Virginia, Minnesota. In July, a mentor to the 15-year-old girl (now 17) reported to the Hudson Police Department that the girl confessed to her that she had lied to police about being assaulted after Heineman was charged. The following month, Heineman's sexual assault conviction was vacated and Heineman was removed from the sex offender registry. In February 2020, WQOW took down a story on Heineman after he threatened to sue the news corporation. WQOW had published an article on their website calling him a sex offender without updating it upon his removal from the registry. The story was removed. In April 2020, it was reported that Heineman was still convicted of violating the sex offender registry due to fleeing to Virginia, Minnesota. The Assistant District Attorney in charge of the case stated that they felt the conviction was valid and appropriate due to Heineman not returning to the jail and failure to update the registry while convicted of third-degree sexual assault. | | | | |
| 2017 | Michael Hickingbottom | Assault | Miami, Indiana | 6 years | 1 years, 9 months | Yes |
| 2017 | Joshua Horner | Child sex abuse | Redmond, Oregon | 50 years | 1 year, 5 months | Yes |
| 2017 | Brenda Jones | Arson* | Friendship, Wisconsin | 9 months, 7 years probation | Not sentenced | Yes |
| 2017 | Brenda Jones | In February 2017, a fire destroyed the home of 49-year-old Brenda Jones. Brenda's home had extensive electrical problems, and she had spent the night with her sister after the electrician failed to show. The insurance company declared that the fire was electrical in nature. But after the fire, Jones' former roommate, Alan Onopa, approached Brenda, grabbed her by the throat and threatened to tell the police that she burned the house down unless she gave him a piece of the insurance money. Brenda refused and reported the assault to the police. Alan then went to the police and accused Brenda of arson, presenting audio tapes in which a female voice said she "lit a match" and burned the house down. Based on Alan's report, Brenda was arrested and charged with arson. At the trial, the police denied knowledge of the assault. Brenda testified that the voice on the tape was not hers, while her defense attorney highlighted Alan's extensive criminal background and argued that Alan had fabricated the tape to get back at Brenda for refusing to pay him. Brenda was convicted of arson and sentenced to nine months in jail and seven years of probation. However, before sentencing, Brenda was granted a new trial on the grounds of ineffective public counsel and the failure to disclose the assault report against Alan. The prosecution subsequently dismissed the charges against her. | | | | |
| February 14, 2018 | Aaron Culbertson | Aggravated robbery | Canton, Ohio | 8 years | 4 years | Yes |
| February 14, 2018 | Aaron Culbertson | 16-year-old Culbertson was charged with aggravated robbery. Evidence showed that two other individuals committed the robbery. In December 2022 the state dismissed the charge, and Culbertson was released. | | | | |
| August 20, 2019 | William Woods | Identity theft | Los Angeles, California | 2 years | 2 years in jail and mental hospitals | Yes |
| August 20, 2019 | William Woods | In the 1980s, while working at a hot dog cart in Albuquerque, New Mexico, Woods's coworker Matthew David Keirans stole his wallet and used it to apply for a fake driver's license under Woods's name. He then began living under the name William Woods for several decades. In 2019, the real Woods discovered he had debt under his name and attempted to inform the bank, but he was unable to answer the security questions that had been set up by Keirans. Woods was arrested and charged with identity theft under the name "Matthew Kierans", being declared incompetent for trial as he continued to insist he was the real Woods. He eventually pled guilty to identity theft and was released on time served. Following his release, he contacted the University of Iowa, where Keirans worked. A detective found Woods's birth father and confirmed his identity with a DNA test. Keirans was arrested, and Woods's conviction was overturned. | | | | |

== See also ==
- Capital punishment debate in the United States
- Capital punishment in the United States
- Innocent prisoner's dilemma
- List of exonerated death row inmates
- List of miscarriage of justice cases
- List of United States death row inmates
- List of women on death row in the United States
- Overturned convictions in the United States
- Race in the United States criminal justice system
- Wrongful executions in the United States
