= Illinois Innocence Project =

American non-profit legal organization

- Formation: 2001
- Founder: Larry Golden; Nancy Ford; Bill Clutter
- Type: Non-profit organization
- Purpose: To bring justice to the wrongfully convicted through advocacy, education, and reform
- Headquarters: University of Illinois at Springfield
- Key people: John J. Hanlon; Larry Golden; Gwen Jordan; Lauren Kaeseberg
- Affiliations: The Innocence Project

The Illinois Innocence Project, a member of the national Innocence Project network, is a non-profit legal organization that works to exonerate wrongfully convicted people and reform the criminal justice system to prevent future injustice.

The national Innocence Project was founded by Barry Scheck and Peter Neufeld in 1992.

== Founding ==
The Illinois Innocence Project, formally known as the Downstate Illinois Innocence Project, was founded in 2001 by Larry Golden, Nancy Ford, and Bill Clutter. The Project is housed in the Center for State Policy and Leadership at the University of Illinois at Springfield.

== Current staff ==
The current staff of the Illinois Innocence Project are:

- John J. Hanlon, Executive and Legal Director
- Larry Golden, Founding Director
- Gwen Jordan, Staff Attorney
- Lauren Kaeseberg, Staff Attorney

== Exonerees ==
The Illinois Innocence Project's work has led to the exonerations of many wrongfully convicted prisoners in Illinois.

=== Keith Harris (2003) ===
Keith Harris, the first inmate helped by the Illinois Innocence Project, was wrongfully convicted and spent 22 years in prison despite the lack of physical evidence tying him to the crime, as well as being misidentified by the victim after seven line-ups in which he appeared. Following Keith's conviction, Girvies Davis and Richard Holman confessed to the crime, and the investigation resulted in new ballistics evidence that supported his innocence.

In 2003, Keith received a full pardon from then Governor Ryan. Keith's pardon is a full pardon, based on actual innocence. His criminal record was expunged.

=== Julie Rea Harper (2006) ===
On October 13, 1997, Julie Rea-Harper's 10-year-old son, Joel, was stabbed to death in the middle of the night by an intruder in the small town of Lawrenceville, Illinois.

Though she had no apparent motive, Julie was indicted on October 12, 2000, on capital murder charges by a special prosecutor. The prosecution's case rested largely on the testimony of bloodstain pattern analysis experts analyzing a very small amount of blood found on Rea Harper's shirt. Another bloodstain pattern analysis expert called by the defense disputed this interpretation. Defended by a lone public defender and outmatched by three opposing prosecutors, Julie was convicted on March 4, 2002, and sentenced to serve 65 years in prison.

On October 24, 2003, the Illinois Innocence Project presented compelling evidence corroborating the confession of Tommy Lynn Sells. The defense's forensic consultant also disputed the testimony of the prosecution's bloodstain pattern analysis expert, stating that there was no scientific basis for his claims. Rea Harper also testified in her own defense.

As she was set to take her first step out of prison, prosecutors re-arrested Julie, ignoring overwhelming evidence that she was innocent. Supporters quickly rallied and raised $75,000 in less than a week's time to secure her release on bond. Instead of seeking justice as new Supreme Court rules require, prosecutors sought to convict her again.

On July 26, 2006, a jury in Carlyle found Julie not guilty of killing her son.

=== Herb Whitlock (2008) ===
On July 6, 1986, newlyweds Dyke and Karen Rhoads were repeatedly stabbed and murdered and their home was set on fire in Paris, Illinois. In 1987, Herbert Whitlock and Randy Steidl were arrested and convicted based on the testimony of Deborah Reinbolt and Darrell Herrington.

While Randy Steidl was convicted on both murder counts, Herb was convicted of only killing Karen. Randy received the death penalty, while Herb received a life sentence. Both men continued to claim their innocence.

In 2000, because of new evidence, the Illinois State Police reopened the case, assigning Lt. Michale Callahan to head the investigation. Callahan found numerous inconsistencies and evidence of misconduct that ultimately led him to conclude that the wrong men had been convicted of the murders. When he reported back to his superiors, he was told that the case was "too politically sensitive" and to drop the investigation. His story can be read in his book, Too Politically Sensitive. Both Herb and Randy continued to pursue appeals and were repeatedly denied until Randy's case was heard by a federal court judge, who ordered a new trial. After intensive review of Randy's case, Attorney General Lisa Madigan dropped all charges against him and he was released in May 2004. Whitlock was released in January 2008.

=== Jonathan Moore (2012) ===
On August 24, 2000, two different shootings occurred in Aurora, Illinois. On August 25, 2000, police interviewed the surviving victim, Leroy Starks, who identified Jonathan Moore from a photo-lineup as the person who shot him and Shaun Miller, the other victim. On August 26, Aurora Police brought in Jonathan Moore on an unrelated traffic stop and questioned him several times about the shooting at the Laundromat. Ultimately he was charged, tried and convicted of murder and two counts of attempted murder following a jury trial in the circuit court of Kane County. He was sentenced to 60 years.

On January 1, 2011, another shooting occurred in Aurora that shed new light on Jonathan's case. In 2011, after receiving information from a new witness associated with Moore's case, the Aurora Police Department reopened their investigation. Teaming up with the Illinois Innocence Project and the Kane County State's Attorney, the parties were able to interview witnesses, new and old, discovering evidence that discredited the two key witnesses against Moore and established his innocence. On March 6, 2012, Jonathan Moore walked out of the Kane County courthouse as a free man for the first time, completely exonerated of his wrongful conviction in 2002.

=== Anthony Murray (2012) ===
In 1998, Anthony Murray was wrongfully convicted of first-degree murder and sentenced to 45 years in prison. After the Marion County Associate Judge ruled that Murray had received ineffective assistance of counsel, Murray's case was reexamined. Students working with the Illinois Innocence Project reviewed Murray's case and discovered that his attorney knowingly called a witness that would incriminate his client, leading the Marion County Associate Judge to vacate Murray's conviction.

To gain full freedom, however, Murray was forced to accept a plea to second-degree murder and was released on time served. His Alford Plea, allowing him to gain freedom by pleading to a lesser crime while still maintaining that he was innocent of all charges, allowed Murray to return home to his mother and family, but it certainly left a stain on what the Illinois Innocence Project feels should have been a complete exoneration, clearing Murray of all charges.

=== Peggy Jo Jackson (2013) ===
Peggy Jo Jackson was granted clemency in 2013 for her conviction of murder.

=== Christopher Abernathy (2015) ===
Christopher Abernathy was convicted of sexual assault and murder in 1987 and given a life sentence.

After serving 28 years in state prison, Abernathy was released from Stateville Correctional Center.

=== Angel Gonzalez (2015) ===
Angel Gonzalez was exonerated after serving more than 20 years of a 55-year sentence for rape and kidnapping, but was not freed immediately because he had been sentenced to three more years for breaking a sink while serving the original sentence for his wrongful conviction.

In light of his wrongful conviction being overturned, Immigration and Customs Enforcement canceled Gonzalez's detainer, which would have required him to be turned over to ICE after his sentence was served.

== Current cases ==
The Illinois Innocence Project (IIP) conducts research and investigative activities for attorneys representing convicted inmates in cases where there is a strong likelihood that the individuals, even though convicted, are actually innocent. The Project concentrates its efforts primarily on non-capital cases and on individuals who, without the assistance of the Project, are likely to remain wrongfully incarcerated for life or a substantial number of years. The Illinois Innocence Project is unique in that it coordinates with Illinois's public universities and their respective law schools at University of Illinois at Urbana–Champaign, University of Illinois at Springfield, Northern Illinois University, and Southern Illinois University. The Project coordinates students, faculty, investigators, attorneys and others willing to work to exonerate eligible individuals.

== Funding ==
The Illinois Innocence Project's funding consists of federal and state grants and private donations.

In 2010, the Illinois Innocence Project received a grant from United States Department of Justice in order to provide funding for laboratory DNA testing, evidence location by investigators, and the filing of post-conviction DNA testing motions in court. The grant is named after Kirk Bloodsworth, whose case was the first DNA death penalty exoneration in the United States.

== Case work ==
The Illinois Innocence Project (IIP) provides investigative and legal research services to attorneys representing inmates who both the attorneys and the Project have good reason to believe did not commit the crimes for which they were convicted. The IIP involves degree seeking undergraduate and graduate students, under the supervision of the inmate's attorney and Project faculty and/or criminal investigator, in providing these services. The IIP does not provide legal representation directly to defendants or inmates.

The IIP's resources are limited. As a result, the primary guidelines that will be weighted in determining whether to accept an inmate's case include the following:

The inmate must be seeking to establish their actual innocence of the crime(s) for which they are incarcerated. More specifically, IIP takes those cases in which there appears to be a significant chance that substantial evidence can be found to prove one innocent. Further, once IIP have agreed to work on a case, the Project reserves the right to withdraw for any reason, including an inability to prove a claim of actual innocence.

The inmate was convicted of a felony committed in Illinois.

In most instances, the inmate must be incarcerated and have at least 48 months remaining on your sentence. The substantial amount of time involved in investigation and follow-up activity makes it impractical to provide assistance on cases where the remaining prison time is less than that.

Finally, the Project does not provide assistance to individuals who are awaiting trial or whose only claim is that their rights were violated. The program usually cannot help in the following situations:

1. where a defendant admits to killing or assaulting someone, but claims that it was done in self-defense;
2. where a defendant admits to sexual contact with a person, but claims that the person consented to the contact;
3. where a defendant was convicted as an accessory (or as a party-to-the-crime) and seeks to show that he or she did not play a major role in the crime.

In deciding whether a case meets the requirement that there be a strong likelihood that the inmate is actually innocent of the crime for which he or she has been convicted, project staff will exam such factors as the following:

- The absence of physical evidence linking the inmate to the crime.
- Problems with the reliability of eyewitnesses.
- Lack of credibility of an inmate's confession.
- The inconsistency of the nature of the crime as compared to the background of the inmate.
- The identification of alternative suspects.
- The availability of DNA evidence that might exonerate the inmate.
- The availability of new evidence exonerating the inmate.
- Police or prosecutorial misconduct.
- The length of time and consistency of the inmate's claim of innocence.

== See also ==
- List of wrongful convictions in the United States
- Capital punishment in the United States
- Innocent prisoner's dilemma
- List of miscarriage of justice cases
- Medill Innocence Project, Illinois
- Investigating Innocence
- Miscarriage of justice
- Other persons exonerated by Innocence Project efforts
  - Cornelius Dupree, exonerated by the Innocence Project
  - Douglas Echols, exonerated by the Innocence Project
  - Benjamin LaGuer, defended by the Innocence Project
  - Anthony McKinney, considered for the Medill Innocence Project
  - Anthony Porter, exonerated by the Medill Innocence Project
  - Ken Wyniemko, exonerated by the Innocence Project
