= Nebraska Innocence Project =

U.S. state non-profit organization branch

The Nebraska Innocence Project was a member organization Nebraska-based chapter of a U.S. non-profit organization called the Innocence Project, located in Omaha, Nebraska. In 2019, the Nebraska Innocence Project folded into the Midwest Innocence Project. The Midwest Innocence Project's mission is to educate about, advocate for, and obtain and support the exoneration and release of wrongfully convicted people in Nebraska, Iowa, Kansas, Missouri, and Arkansas. The Nebraska chapter was founded in 2005 by a group of volunteers who were inspired by the work of Barry Scheck and Peter Neufeld, founders of the Innocence Project in 1992. The Midwest Innocence Project (MIP) was founded in 2001 through the UMKC School of Law and is also part of the national Innocence Network.

== Founding ==
A group of volunteers including an Iowa attorney formed the Iowa/Nebraska Innocence Project in 2005 after meeting the founders of the Innocence Project, Barry Scheck and Peter Neufeld, and several exonerated people at a national conference. Their goal was to form a local version of the project. By 2007 the Iowa/Nebraska Innocent Project became the Nebraska Innocence Project. The organization is part of the Innocence Network, which is a group of 40 innocence projects across the nation, all working to provide accessible information, consultation on cases, and media resources pro-bono.

== Work ==
The Nebraska Innocence Project works primarily with cases involving DNA testing. According to the New York Innocence Project, more than 75% of people who have been exonerated in the United States through DNA testing, have served in prison on the basis of faulty eyewitness accounts. Meanwhile, a recent change to Nebraska state law will allow the project to look at cases not involving DNA such as arson cases, Shaken Baby Syndrome, bite marks, and shoe print-analysis. The Nebraska Innocence Project relies on the work of volunteers and essentially works without a budget. A partnership between the Nebraska chapter and the Midwest Innocence Project, which launched in October 2015, allows Nebraska to take advantage of the Midwest Innocence Project's paid administration, which they intend to do by hiring a paid legal director. To exonerate wrongfully convicted prisoners, the Nebraska Innocence Project sends requests to the Midwest Innocence Project, based in Kansas City, Missouri who prepares the cases and sends them back to Nebraska for investigation and possible litigation. Legal director, Tricia Bushnell assists the Nebraska chapter by organizing cases and finding experts who could help the case.

== Notable Cases ==
=== Beatrice 6 ===
Commonly referred to the Beatrice 6, a 1985 case in Gage County involved the rape and murder of 68-year-old woman, Helen Wilson, in her apartment. Six people, three men and three women were found guilty of committing the crime. After surfacing evidence that their conviction was based on coerced confessions and the malpractice of forensics, DNA testing of the original evidence proved their innocence. The DNA evidence was the first to be used as means to exonerate someone in the state of Nebraska. The six were awarded between $35,000-$500,00 by the state of Nebraska for their wrongful conviction under the Wrongful Conviction Act.

=== Juneal Pratt ===
In 1975 Juneal Pratt was convicted of rape, sexual assault and robbery of two sisters from Iowa in an Omaha motel. At 19 he was arrested and was picked from a lineup by the two sisters months later despite witnesses who claimed he was at home at the time of the crime. He was sentenced to 32 to 90 years in prison. Pratt has since maintained his innocence and requested DNA testing after a 2001 Nebraska law was passed that allows convicted felons to request DNA testing of preserved evidence if such technology was unavailable during their trial.

== Executive Board ==
- Executive Director: Tracy Hightower-Henne
- Secretary: Leah Georges
- Rebecca Murray

== See also ==
- Alaska Innocence Project
- California Innocence Project
- Georgia Innocence Project
- Illinois Innocence Project
- Northern California Innocence Project
