= After Innocence =

- Directed by: Jessica Sanders
- Written by: Jessica Sanders; Marc H. Simon
- Produced by: Jessica Sanders; Marc H. Simon
- Cinematography: Shana Hagan; Buddy Squires; Bestor Cram; Bob Richmond
- Music by: Charles Bernstein
- Production companies: American Film Foundation; Showtime Networks
- Distributed by: New Yorker Films
- Release date: January 2005 (Sundance)
- Running time: 95 minutes
- Country: United States
- Language: English

After Innocence is a 2005 American documentary film about men who were exonerated from death row by DNA evidence. Directed by Jessica Sanders, the film won the Special Jury Prize at the 2005 Sundance Film Festival.

The featured exonerees are Dennis Maher; Calvin Willis; Scott Hornoff; Wilton Dedge; Vincent Moto; Nick Yarris; Ronald Cotton; and Herman Atkins. Also featured are Barry Scheck and Peter Neufeld of the Innocence Project and Lola Vollen of the Life After Exoneration Program.

== Reception ==
On review aggregator website Rotten Tomatoes, the film holds an approval rating of 92% based on 48 reviews, with an average rating of 7.5/10. The website's consensus reads: "This understated yet emotionally devastating documentary lets the stories of its subjects speak for themselves."

== Awards ==
- Sundance Film Festival—Special Jury Prize; Grand Jury Prize (nominated)
- Seattle International Film Festival—Women in Cinema Lena Sharpe Award
- Newport Beach Film Festival—Special Jury Prize
- Independent Film Festival of Boston—Audience Award
- Full Frame Documentary Film Festival—Content + Intent = Change Award
- Nantucket Film Festival—Best Storytelling In A Documentary

== See also ==
- List of wrongful convictions in the United States
- Innocence Project
- List of miscarriage of justice cases
- Race in the United States criminal justice system
- Capital punishment in the United States
- Innocent prisoner's dilemma
- Miscarriage of justice
- False confession
- Overturned convictions in the United States
- Capital punishment debate in the United States
- List of exonerated death row inmates
