= The Innocence Files =

2020 American documentary television mini-series

- Genre: Documentary; Crime; Drama
- Directed by: Roger Ross Williams, Jed Rothstein, Sarah Dowland, Liz Garbus, Alex Gibney, Andy Grieve
- Country of origin: United States
- Original language: English
- No. of seasons: 1
- No. of episodes: 9

Production
- Executive producers: Michael Antinoro, Liz Garbus, Alex Gibney, Will Staeger, Roger Ross Williams, Dan Cogan, Brad Hebert, Geoff Martz, Stacey Offman, Richard Perello, Brad Hebert
- Producers: Nick Capote, Nell Constantinople, Jonathan Jordan, Keith McQuirter, Kevin Huffman, Jed Rothstein, Sarah Dowland, Andy Grieve, Charlotte Kaufman
- Running time: 51–85 minutes

Original release
- Network: Netflix
- Release: April 15, 2020

The Innocence Files is a 2020 American true crime documentary miniseries about wrongful convictions, and how they can affect the lives of the involved. The series is based upon the work of the Innocence Project, which is committed to exonerating individuals who it believes to have been wrongfully convicted.

== Cast ==
- Peter Neufeld
- Barry Scheck
- Michael West
- Gary Wells
- Levon Brooks
- Kennedy Brewer
- Adam Freeman
- Richard Souviron
- Gloria Williams

== Release and Critical reception ==
The Innocence Files was released on April 15, 2020 on Netflix. The critical aggregator Metacritic awarded The Innocence Files a score of 86, indicating "universal acclaim".
