= Fileless malware =

Malicious software that exists solely in RAM

Fileless malware is a variant of computer related malicious software that exists exclusively as a computer memory-based artifact i.e. in RAM. It does not write any part of its activity to the computer's hard drive, thus increasing its ability to evade antivirus software that incorporate file-based whitelisting, signature detection, hardware verification, pattern-analysis, time-stamping, etc., and leaving very little evidence that could be used by digital forensic investigators to identify illegitimate activity. Malware of this type is designed to work in memory, so its existence on the system lasts only until the system is rebooted.

== Definition ==
Fileless malware is sometimes considered synonymous with in-memory malware as both perform their core functionalities without writing data to disk during the lifetime of their operation. This has led some commentators to claim that this variant strain is nothing new and simply a “redefinition of the well-known term, memory resident virus”, whose pedigree can be traced back to the 1980s with the birth of the Lehigh Virus that was developed by the originator of the term, Fred Cohen, and became influential with his paper on the topic.

This synonymy is however incorrect. Although the aforementioned behavioral execution environment is the same, in both cases i.e. both malware variants are executed in system memory, the crucial differentiation is the method of inception and prolongation. Most malware's infection vector involves some writing to the hard disk, in order for it to be executed, whose origin could take the form of an infected file attachment, external media device e.g. USB, peripheral, mobile phone etc., browser drive-by, side-channel etc.

Each of the aforementioned methods has to have contact with the host system's hard drive, in some form or another, meaning that even when employing the stealthiest anti-forensic methods, some form of the infected residue will be left on the host media.

Fileless malware on the other hand, from the point of inception until process termination (usually by way of a system reboot), aims never to have its contents written to disk. Its purpose is to reside in volatile system areas such as the system registry, in-memory processes and service areas.

Fileless malware commonly employs the Living off the Land (LotL) technique which refers to the use of pre-existing operating system binaries to perform tasks. Among these pre-existing operating system binaries, PowerShell is a commonly abused LotL tool used in fileless PowerShell attack techniques to execute malicious code directly in memory. The goal of this technique is to avoid unnecessarily dropping extra malware on the system to perform tasks that can be done using already existing resources. This boosts stealthiness, primarily because the pre-existing system binaries are commonly signed and trusted. An example might be an attacker using PsExec to connect to a target system. In February 2024, the Cybersecurity and Infrastructure Security Agency (CISA), the National Security Agency and the Federal Bureau of Investigation, together with partner agencies including the Australian Cyber Security Centre, the Canadian Centre for Cyber Security and the national cyber security centres of the United Kingdom and New Zealand, published joint guidance on detecting and mitigating living-off-the-land activity. The agencies stated that many organizations lack the security practices needed to detect the technique, so it remains effective for attackers who need to invest little in tooling, and that such activity can be hard for administrators to tell apart from legitimate behavior. The guidance drew in part on incident response at critical infrastructure organizations, including some compromised by the PRC state-sponsored group Volt Typhoon.

== History ==
Fileless malware is an evolutionary strain of malicious software that has taken on a steady model of self-improvement/enhancement with a drive towards clearly defined focused attack scenarios, whose roots can be traced back to terminate-and-stay-resident viral programs that, once launched, would reside in memory awaiting a system interrupt before gaining access to their control flow; examples were seen in viruses such as Frodo, The Dark Avenger, and Number of the Beast.

These techniques evolved by way of temporary memory resident viruses, were seen in famous examples such as Anthrax and Monxla, and took on their truer fileless nature by way of in-memory injected network viruses/worms such as CodeRed and Slammer. Evolutionary incarnations have been seen in modern viruses such as Stuxnet, Duqu, Poweliks, and Phasebot.

== Recent developments ==
On February 8, 2017, Kaspersky Lab's Global Research & Analysis Team published a report titled: "Fileless attacks against enterprise networks" which implicates variants of this type of malware, and its latest incarnations, affecting 140 enterprise networks across the globe with banks, telecommunication companies and government organizations being the top targets.

The report details how a variant of fileless malware is using PowerShell scripts (located within the Microsoft Windows Registry system) to launch an attack against a target's machine leveraging a common attack framework called Metasploit with supporting attack tools such as Mimikatz, and leveraging standard Windows utilities such as ‘SC’ and ‘NETSH’ to assist with lateral movement.

The malware was only detected after a bank identified the Metasploit Meterpreter code running in physical memory on a central domain controller (DC).

Kaspersky Labs is not the only company to have identified such emerging trends, with most of the principal IT security anti-malware companies coming forward with similar findings: Symantec, Trend Micro, and Cybereason.

== Digital forensics ==
The emergence of malware that operates in a fileless way presents a major problem to digital forensic investigators, whose reliance on being able to obtain digital artifacts from a crime scene is critical to ensuring chain of custody and producing evidence that is admissible in a court of law.

Many well-known digital forensic process models such as: Casey 2004, DFRWS 2001, NIJ 2004, Cohen 2009, all embed either an examination and/or analysis phase into their respective models, implying that evidence can be obtained/collected/preserved by some mechanism.

The difficulty becomes apparent when considering the standard operating procedures of digital investigators and how they should deal with a computer at a crime scene. Traditional methods direct the investigator to:

- Do not, in any circumstances, switch the computer on
- Make sure that the computer is switched off – some screen savers may give the appearance that the computer is switched off, but hard drive and monitor activity lights may indicate that the machine is switched on.
- Remove the main power source battery from laptop computers.
- Unplug the power and other devices from sockets on the computer itself

Fileless malware subverts the forensics models, as evidence acquisition can only take place against a memory image that has been obtained from a live running system that is to be investigated. This method, however, can itself compromise the acquired host's memory image and render legal admissibility questionable, or at the very least, instill enough reasonable doubt that the weight of the evidence presented may be drastically reduced, increasing the chances that Trojan horse or "some other dude done it" defenses may be used more effectively.

This renders this type of malware extremely attractive to adversaries wishing to secure a foothold in a network, perform difficult to trace lateral movement and do so in a quick and silent manner, when standard forensic investigatory practices are ill-prepared for the threat.

== Notable attacks ==
- Democratic National Committee cyber attacks
