= Conviction and exoneration of Glenn Ford =

Glenn Ford (October 29, 1949 – June 29, 2015) was convicted of murder in 1984 and released from Angola Prison in March 10, 2014 after a full exoneration. Ford was born in Shreveport, Louisiana. He was the longest-serving death-row inmate in the United States to be exonerated before his death. He was denied compensation by the state of Louisiana for his wrongful conviction after a court determined that he was still guilty of lesser charges directly related to the crime.

== Arrest ==
Isadore Rozeman, 58, was found dead in his jewelry store on November 5, 1983, by Shreveport police, who had been notified by acquaintance Dr. A. R. Ebrahim that the shop appeared to be in disarray. Rozeman had been murdered with a single gunshot wound to the back of the head. Glenn Ford, Rozeman's yard man, was known to be in the vicinity of the store at the time of the murder and identified by multiple people at the trial. He was known to be with Jake and Henry Robinson after the crime, showing materials stolen from the crime scene, as well as a .22 caliber pistol belonging to Jake. An acquaintance of Ford's testified that he had a .38 pistol in his waistband the morning of the crime, the same caliber bullet found at the crime scene. Police initially were unable to find any evidence of the crime at Ford's residence, but did find residue from a gunshot wound on his left hand (he is left-handed). Ford was immediately taken into custody. Evidence was, however, found in Henry Robinson's possession, as well as pawn shop receipts in Ford's name from the date of the murder.

== Conviction ==
Ford was assigned two attorneys by the state due to his inability to pay for a lawyer on his own. Both were selected from an alphabetical listing of lawyers from the local bar association. The lead attorney was an oil and gas lawyer who had never tried a case, criminal or civil, before a jury. The second attorney had been out of law school for only two years and worked at an insurance defense firm on slip and fall cases. Prosecutors were able to take advantage of the defense's inexperience and use a peremptory challenge capacity to keep African Americans off the jury, resulting in an all Caucasian jury with a Caucasian judge. Ford was convicted and sentenced to death by the jury without a murder weapon linking him to the crime, and with evidence from confidential informants withheld.

Barry Scheck of the Innocence Project has levied the accusation that racism played a role in the conviction, as he faced a completely Caucasian jury despite living in a community that is at least half African American. He goes on to state that this is part of a broader pattern in the American legal system, and that uniform juries tend to deliberate less than diverse juries drawn from a range of backgrounds. He continues that "diverse juries are more likely to challenge one another, and less likely to fall back on what may be unconscious stereotypes."

Ford was sentenced to death by electrocution at Louisiana State Penitentiary in August 1988.

== Exoneration ==
In 2000, the Louisiana Supreme Court ordered a hearing on Ford's claim that the prosecution suppressed evidence that might have shown Jake and Henry Robinson to be responsible for the murder (the two were initially implicated in the crime).

In 2013, an unidentified informant told prosecutors that Jake Robinson admitted to shooting and killing Rozeman. This led to Ford's legal team filing a motion to vacate his conviction and sentence in March 2014, stating that "credible evidence...supporting a finding that Ford was neither present at, nor a participant in, the robbery and murder of Isadore Rozeman." State District Judge Ramona Emanuel overturned his conviction that same month.

=== Life after exoneration ===
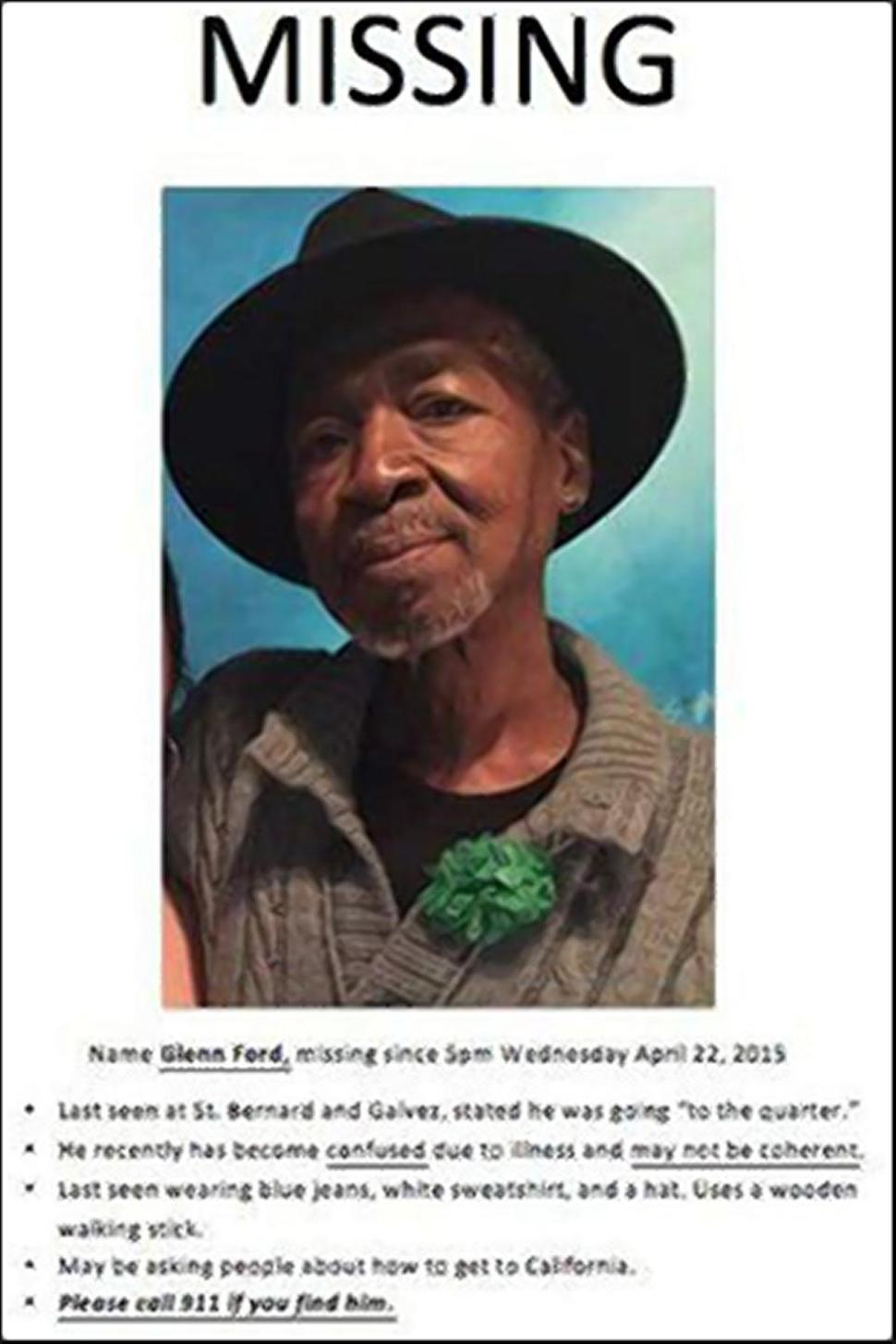
Poster distributed in New Orleans and to local media on the evening of Ford's disappearance

Soon after release from prison, Ford was diagnosed with terminal metastatic carcinoma of the lung. He entered home hospice care under the supervision of Johnathan Thompson (of Connick v. Thompson fame) and his organization Resurrection After Exoneration in New Orleans, LA.

Ford went missing on the night of April 22, 2015, after a precipitous change in mental state, possibly the result of his physical illness. Police initiated a search and he was found the next day, bloodied and without memory of the event.

Ford was eligible for a $313,000 settlement under Louisiana law, but a judge denied the petition for the funds, stating that there was sufficient evidence to conclude that he had some role in the initial crime as he had been in possession of stolen goods when arrested. Ford knew a robbery was going to take place and did not stop it, according to a 60 Minutes program that aired September 4, 2016. Further, he attempted to destroy evidence by pawning items taken in the robbery and tried to find buyers for the murder weapon used by men Ford implicated in the murder, according to Caddo Parrish District Judge Katherine Dorroh.

The court found that given the underlying facts, Ford could've still been convicted of second degree murder. It also found sufficient evidence to conclude that Ford was still guilty of being an accessory after the fact to first degree murder, conspiracy to commit armed robbery, being a principle to armed robbery, and illegal possession of stolen things.

Ford died under hospice care on June 29, 2015, from complications due to lung cancer.

=== Criticism of the trial ===
After learning of Ford's innocence, A.M. "Marty" Stroud III, prosecutor for the Caddo Parish District Attorney's office in the Ford case, regrets his role in the conviction. He has stated that he believes Ford had an unfair trial where key evidence was suppressed by both police and prosecutors and that Ford's lawyers did not have the financial resources nor the criminal law experience to mount a proper defense. He feels that if he had done his job properly at the time, and all the evidence had been properly collected, "they would not have even been able to arrest Glenn Ford, let alone try him for the crime."
