= Julius Ruffin and Arthur Lee Whitfield =

Wrongful convictions in Virginia, United States

Both Arthur Lee Whitfield and Julius Ruffin are men accused of rape in Virginia who were convicted and subsequently exonerated.

== Arthur Lee Whitfield ==
On August 14, 1981, Arthur Lee Whitfield was accused of the rape of a woman in Norfolk, Virginia. Twenty five years ago, the woman identified Whitfield as her attacker, describing him as a tall, muscular black, light skinned with hazel eyes (Washington). This description was also used to identify an attacker from another rape that occurred earlier that night. Whitfield was tried and convicted for these two rapes and sentenced to 63 years (Washington).

Whitfield was released by Virginia authorities in August 2004, when a Norfolk prosecutor said DNA evidence proved Whitfield did not commit the two rapes. Whitfield had already served 22 years for the rapes that DNA proved he did not commit (Innocence Project).

The woman in the alleged attack does not agree with the DNA testing, saying she knew who she saw. The victim questions state authorities on the profile of Mary Jane Burton, the former crime lab scientist whose work has sparked a review of hundreds of cases and exoneration from the former governor, Mark Warner (Isadora). Whitfield was released on parole, but is trying to get a pardon from the Virginia governor, Tim Kaine. Since the Virginia Supreme Court did not declare him innocent (Isadora), if Whitfield does not get his record cleared, he will be a registered sex offender for life.

== Julius Ruffin ==
On December 6, 1981, Julius Ruffin was accused of raping, sodomizing, and robbing a woman in her home. The victim looked for a black male and identified Ruffin as her attacker, though the description did not match up (Mid-Atlantic Innocence Project). Ruffin is 6 ft 1 in (185 cm), with light skin, and two distinguishable gold teeth and facial hair. She identified her attacker as 5 ft 8 in (173 cm) with dark skin. On October 1, 1982, he ended being sentenced to life in prison.

In June 2002, Virginia courts passed a law that allowed felons to petition the courts for DNA testing. On February 13 of the following year Ruffin, was released by DNA testing. Ruffin was pardoned by the former governor of Virginia and given $1.5 million in compensation (Innocence Project).

== Similarity in cases ==
These cases were revisited for two reasons. For one their lawyers never gave up fighting for them. Second the Virginia courts passed the law to let felons petition for DNA testing. Since both of these things were done to a great extent the cases were reopened and retested. It proved that they were innocent of the charges after all.

The new evidence this brought out was that the former crime lab scientist had kept the DNA in her notebook which allegedly could have caused contamination and getting the real rapist out of trouble and the innocent ones in trouble.

== Exoneration ==
Although the real criminal has been convicted, only one of the 'convicts' has had his name totally cleared. Julius Ruffin received $1.5 million in compensation and has had his name completely erased from the registered sex offender list and his record has been cleared of the crimes (Makron). However, Arthur Lee Whitfield is still on the registered sex offender list, has yet to receive a pardon from the Governor of Virginia, and no verdict or decision has been made (Makron).

Once the actual rapist was found, both Ruffin and Whitfield were exonerated. Aaron Doxie III, the real perpetrator was convicted for unrelated rapes, and will not be tried for the Virginia rapes because the cases are too cold and much of the evidence has been destroyed (Washington). Furthermore, most of the witnesses, including Mary Jane Burton, the crime lab scientist who preserved the original samples, were dead.

Also, both of the women insist that Ruffin and Whitfield, respectively, are their attackers.

== See also ==
- List of wrongful convictions in the United States
