= Midwest Innocence Project =

American legal non-profit organization

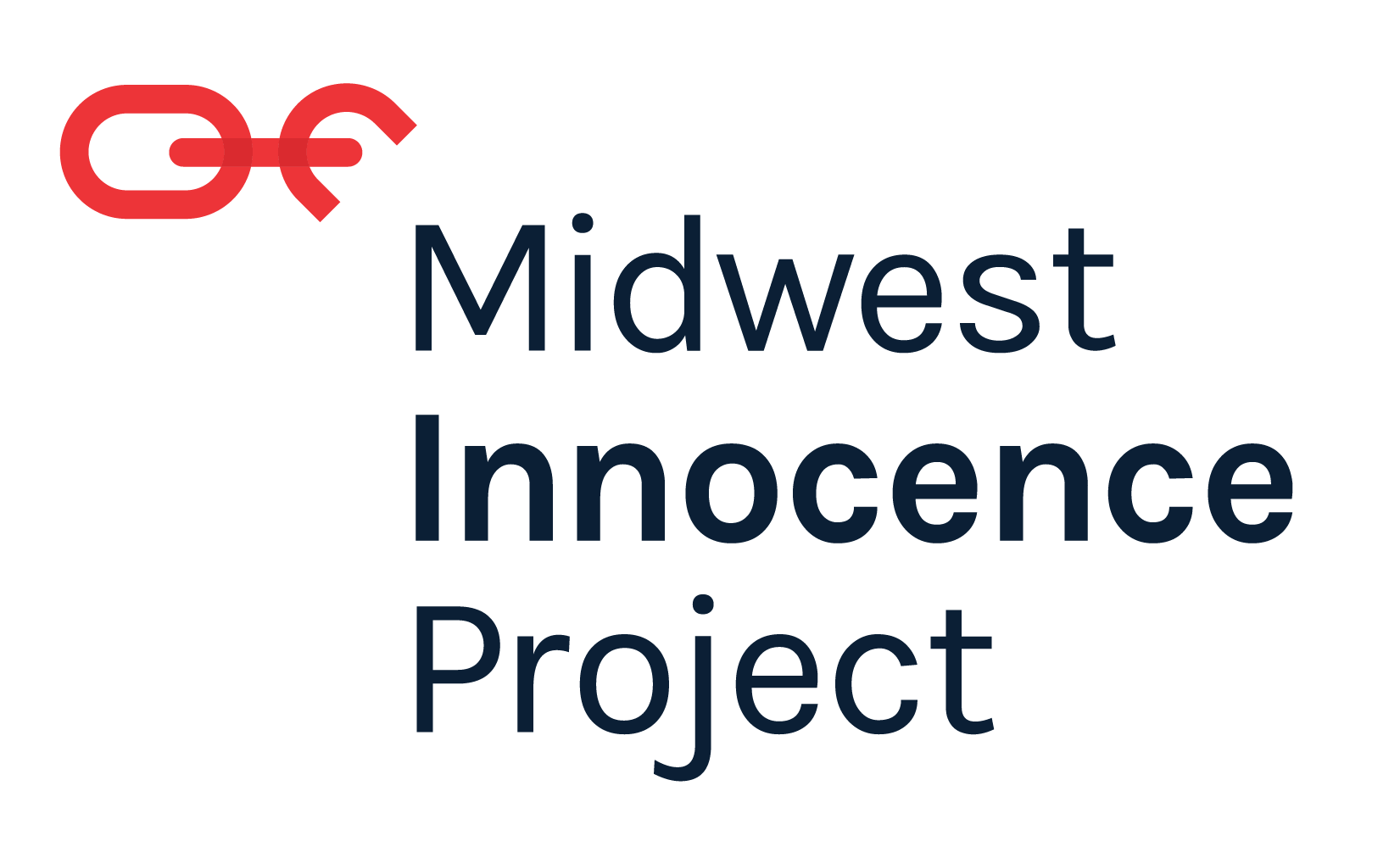
- Abbreviation: MIP
- Founded: October 2001
- Founded at: University of Missouri–Kansas City School of Law
- Type: 501(c)(3)
- Tax ID no.: 43-1914499
- Headquarters: 300 E 39th St., Kansas City, Missouri, United States
- Region served: Arkansas, Iowa, Kansas, Missouri, Nebraska
- Legal Director: Rachel Wester
- Executive Director: Tahir Atwater
- Board President: Matt Jacober
- Affiliations: Innocence Network
- Revenue: $1.73 M USD (2024)
- Expenses: $2.01 M USD (2024)
- Website: themip.org
- Formerly called: Midwestern Innocence Project

Midwest Innocence Project is a nonprofit 501(c)(3) legal organization headquartered in Kansas City, Missouri, United States. It works to exonerate wrongfully convicted people in Arkansas, Iowa, Kansas, Missouri, and Nebraska. It engages in investigation and pro bono litigation on behalf of its clients, as well as education about and advocacy for exoneration of the wrongfully convicted. Founded in 2001 through the University of Missouri–Kansas City School of Law, MIP is now an independent organization in the Innocence Network and maintains partnerships with law firms, law schools, and public defender's offices. As of 2026, eighteen of its clients have been released from prison, twelve of which have been exonerated.

== History ==
MIP was founded in 2001 at the University of Missouri–Kansas City School of Law as law school clinic. It emerged during the broader "innocence movement" that followed the founding of the Innocence Project at the Benjamin N. Cardozo School of Law in 1992. Tax filings indicate that MIP became independent of the UMKC School of Law in 2004.

In 2013, Robert Nelson was released from Crossroads Correctional Center in Cameron, Missouri and exonerated after serving thirty years in prison. Nelson was MIP's first client to be released and the first to be exonerated after DNA testing proved his innocence.

In 2014, MIP formed a partnership with the Project for Innocence at the University of Kansas School of Law. The following year, Floyd Bledsoe of Kansas became MIP's second client to be released and exonerated. MIP also formed a partnership with the Iowa State Public Defender Wrongful Conviction Division and merged with the Nebraska Innocence Project in 2015.

MIP launched a social work program in 2020, and also entered a partnership with the MacArthur Justice Center. In 2021, it established a joint fellowship program with the law firm Bryan Cave Leighton Paisner.

While representing Lamar Johnson in 2019, MIP worked with St. Louis Circuit Attorney Kimberly Gardner, who alleged there was police and prosecutorial misconduct in Johnson's 1995 trial and filed a motion for a new trial. At the time, Missouri law did not authorize elected prosecutors to seek a new trial after a conviction had become final, and the Missouri Supreme Court denied Gardner's motion in March 2021. Later that year, however, the Missouri General Assembly enacted Missouri Revised Statutes § 547.031, which authorizes elected prosecutors to file a motion to vacate a judgment based on evidence of a convicted person's innocence. MIP, along with Johnson's other attorneys and Gardner, subsequently filed a motion under the new statute. In 2023, the motion was granted and Johnson was exonerated. MIP used § 547.031 in cooperation with elected prosecutors in the exonerations of Kevin Strickland in 2021 and Christopher Dunn in 2024.

== Activities ==
=== Exonerations ===
MIP engages in investigation and legal representation to prove its clients' innocence and then to achieve their exoneration. MIP only represents clients who claim they are actually innocent of the crime they were convicted for, are located in its territory, are incarcerated with at least ten years remaining on their sentences, have exhausted their ability to appeal their convictions, and are not otherwise represented by an attorney.

As of 2026, twelve of MIP's clients have been exonerated.

- Robert Nelson was incarcerated in Missouri for more than twenty-nine years following his conviction for a 1983 rape. He was exonerated in 2013 after DNA evidence proved his innocence.
- Floyd Bledsoe was incarcerated in Kansas for more than sixteen years following his conviction for a 1999 murder. He was exonerated in 2015 after DNA evidence proved his innocence.
- Richard Jones was incarcerated in Kansas for more than eighteen years following his conviction for a 1999 aggravated robbery. He was exonerated in 2017 in part because of the lack of physical evidence and the improper eyewitness lineup used to convict him.
- Lamonte McIntyre was incarcerated in Kansas for more than twenty-three years following his conviction for a 1994 double murder. He was exonerated in 2017 in part because of the lack of physical evidence and police misconduct on behalf of Kansas City, Kansas Police Department detective Roger Golubski.
- Ricky Kidd was incarcerated in Missouri for more than twenty-three years for a 1996 double murder. He was exonerated in 2019 in part because of the lack of physical evidence, an improper eyewitness identification by a four-year-old, and prosecutorial misconduct.
- John Brown was incarcerated in Arkansas for more than twenty-six years following his conviction for a 1998 murder. He was exonerated in 2020 in part because of prosecutorial misconduct during his conviction.
- Olin "Pete" Coones was incarcerated in Kansas for more than twelve years following his conviction for a 2008 double murder. He was exonerated in 2020 in part because of police and prosecutorial misconduct during his conviction.
- Kevin Strickland was incarcerated in Missouri for more than forty-three years following his conviction for a 1978 triple murder. He was exonerated in 2021 in part because of improper eyewitness identification and prosecutorial misconduct during his conviction.
- Rontarus Washington spent more than five years in pretrial incarceration in Kansas for a 2014 murder he was accused of committing. In 2020, Washington was released on bond, and in 2021, the district attorney dismissed the charges against him.
- Lamar Johnson was incarcerated for more than twenty-seven years in Missouri following his conviction for a 1994 murder. He was exonerated in 2023 in part because of improper eyewitness lineup, false testimony, and police and prosecutorial misconduct during his conviction.
- Christopher Dunn was incarcerated for more than thirty-three years in Missouri following his conviction for a 1990 murder. He was exonerated in 2024 in part because of the lack of physical evidence and improper eyewitness identification involving two minors. Dunn was kept imprisoned for an additional week after a St. Louis judge ordered his release because of an emergency order by the Missouri Supreme Court upon the request of Missouri Attorney General Andrew Bailey.
- Cedric Warren was incarcerated for more than fifteen years in Kansas following his conviction for a 2009 double murder. He was exonerated in 2024 in part because of the lack of physical evidence, improper eyewitness identification, police misconduct involving Kansas City, Kansas Police Department detective Roger Golubski, and prosecutorial misconduct.

=== Releases from prison ===
As of 2026, six of MIP's clients have been released from prison without being exonerated, despite MIP contending they are innocent.

- Juneal Pratt was incarcerated for more than forty-one years in Nebraska following his conviction for a 1975 rape. He was granted parole and released from prison in 2017.
- Rodney Lincoln was incarcerated for more than thirty-six years in Missouri following his conviction for a 1982 murder. In 2018, Missouri Governor Eric Greitens commuted Lincoln's sentence without pardoning him.
- Faye Jacobs was incarcerated for twenty-six years in Arkansas following her conviction for a 1992 murder. In 2018, she was resentenced to time served and released from prison after the United States Supreme Court ruled that juveniles cannot be sentenced to life without parole in Miller v. Alabama.
- Anthony Dixon was incarcerated for more than twenty-eight years in Missouri following his conviction for a 1993 rape. He was granted parole and released from prison in 2021.
- Michael Politte was incarcerated for more than twenty-three years in Missouri following his conviction for a 1998 murder. In 2022, he was granted parole and released from prison after the United States Supreme Court ruled that juveniles cannot be sentenced to life without parole in Miller v. Alabama.
- Celester McKinney was incarcerated for more than twenty-five years in Kansas following his conviction for a 1997 murder. He was granted parole and released from prison in 2023.

=== Social work ===
As of 2026, MIP employs one full-time social worker who provides mental health and support services to incarcerated and freed clients.
