= Anthony Massingill =

- Citizenship: United States
- Known for: Miscarriage of justice
- Criminal charges: Rape and Robbery – 1979
- Criminal status: Incarcerated

Anthony Massingill is an American who was convicted in a Dallas, Texas court of a 1979 rape and robbery for which recent DNA test results support his claim of innocence. He was jointly convicted in the case along with Cornelius Dupree who was on January 4, 2011, fully exonerated of the charges. Massingill is being represented by the Texas Wesleyan Innocence Project and is likely to be cleared at a later hearing.

Unlike Dupree, who was paroled in July 2010, Massingill was also charged with and convicted of another rape in 1980, for which he remains incarcerated. He maintains his innocence in that second case, where DNA testing is still ongoing.

== See also ==
- List of miscarriage of justice cases
- Overturned convictions in the United States
- List of wrongful convictions in the United States
