= The Innocence Project =

2006 British television series

- Genre: Legal drama
- Created by: Oliver Brown
- Written by: Stephen Brady; Ed McCardie; Paul Logue; Abigail Harvey
- Directed by: Bill Anderson; Peter Hoar; Morag Mackinnon
- Starring: Lloyd Owen; Christine Bottomley; Ruth Bradley; Stephen Graham; Oliver James; Luke Treadaway; Shelley Conn
- Composer: Tim Phillips
- Country of origin: United Kingdom
- Original language: English
- No. of series: 1
- No. of episodes: 8

Production
- Executive producers: Paul Abbott; Hilary Bevan-Jones
- Producer: Kirstie MacDonald
- Cinematography: Ian Adrian
- Editors: Charles Alexander; Fiona Colbeck
- Running time: 60 minutes
- Production companies: Tightrope Pictures; BBC Northern Ireland

Original release
- Network: BBC One
- Release: 9 November 2006 – 7 February 2007

The Innocence Project is an eight-part television drama series created by BBC Northern Ireland and first broadcast on BBC One on 9 November 2006. The series follows the work of Professor Jon Ford (Lloyd Owen), who sets up The Innocence Project, peopled entirely by a hand-picked group of law students. They take on cases pro bono that no one else will handle, or those that have been forgotten or given up on, working for clients that would otherwise have no hope, and who have possibly been wrongly convicted. The series is based on a British version of the Innocence Project, a non-profit legal clinic in the United States.

The Innocence Project fared particularly poorly for a BBC primetime drama, and received a number of negative reviews. In an unusual move for the BBC, the series was pulled from the schedules mid-run, and the final three episodes were not broadcast until over a month later. The BBC subsequently confirmed that the series would not be renewed. Notably, the series has also never been issued on DVD.

== Foundation ==
The first and best-known Innocence organization is based at the Benjamin N. Cardozo School of Law of Yeshiva University. It directly serves defendants who can conclusively be proven innocent by DNA testing of evidence done after their convictions. The clinic was founded in 1992 by Barry Scheck and Peter Neufeld. In addition to working on behalf of those who may have been wrongfully convicted of crimes throughout the United States, the Innocence Project performs research and advocacy related to the causes of wrongful convictions. The Innocence Project is a member of the recently formed Innocence Network, which brings together a number of innocence organizations from across the United States.

As of 2012, 292 defendants previously convicted of serious crimes in the United States have been exonerated by DNA testing. Almost all of these convictions involved some form of sexual assault and approximately 25% involved murder. Dr. Michael Naughton, founder and director of the Innocence Network UK (INUK), set up the first innocence project in Britain at the University of Bristol in January 2005. Additionally, INUK has actively assisted in setting up over 30 innocence projects in British universities and referred approximately 90 cases to member innocence projects for further investigation.

== Cast ==
- Lloyd Owen – Professor Jon Ford
- Christine Bottomley – Sarah Shawcross
- Ruth Bradley – Beth McNair
- Stephen Graham – Andrew Lucas
- Oliver James – Nick Benitz
- Luke Treadaway – Adam Solomons
- Shelley Conn – Dr. Eve Walker
- Andrea Lowe – Philippa Lucas
- Ruta Gedmintas – Mary Jarvis
- Thomas Turgoose – Darren "Dizzy" Littlewood
- Charlotte Emmerson – Lizzie Ford

== Episodes ==
No.	Title	Directed by	Written by	Original release date	UK viewers (millions)
1	"Beyond Reasonable Doubt"	Bill Anderson	Oliver Brown	9 November 2006	N/A
A convicted killer, Luke Talbot, has always proclaimed his innocence and the team start to review the case against him, which appears uncertain. While still going through the serious business of growing up at university, the students search for new evidence which could set him free. Nick also finds himself on the wrong side of the criminal justice system – which could mean the end of his legal career before it even starts.
2	"The Science Doesn't Lie"	Morag Mackinnon	Stephen Brady	16 November 2006	N/A
Beth tries to convince an apparently unenthusiastic Ford about the merits of a case in which the infallibility of fingerprint evidence comes under scrutiny. Vulnerable Martin Toal retracted a confession of murder, even though his fingerprints were found at the crime scene. Beth believes the system has let Toal down. Adam is mentoring a young boy, Dizzy, but trying to overturn his ASBO is loaded with difficulty. With her mother putting extra pressure on her, Beth finds herself with more on her plate than she can handle.
3	"No Body"	Bill Anderson	Ed McCardie	23 November 2006	N/A
Adam tries to understand how a murder conviction can be beyond reasonable doubt – when there is no body. John McKenna had been convicted of murdering his common-law wife, but her body was never found. Meanwhile, Ford makes Nick struggle with a case that is over 300 years old – an attempt to prove the innocence of a woman who was executed as a witch. Sarah is caught off-guard when her boyfriend from home, Craig, turns up with an unexpected proposal.
4	"The Joint Enterprise Review"	Morag Mackinnon	Oliver Brown	30 November 2006	N/A
The students tackle the complex ramifications of a joint trial: co-defendants who were tried together and both convicted of murder. But they hit a wall when they attempt to analyse upon what evidence the jury ultimately based their guilty verdict. Beth is appalled by the injustice and wants to approach the jury. But Ford lays down the law – such an approach would be illegal. Meanwhile, Sarah and Nick get sidetracked by a case involving an adult website and the question of just what obscenity means in this day and age.
5	"Trapped"	Peter Hoar	Stephen Brady	7 December 2006	N/A
An old face appears from Ford's past, asking for help, but Ford is not so sure he wants to get involved. The students attempt to help a convicted drug dealer get her sentence reduced. Rhiannon Hayes was convicted of selling drugs to an undercover policeman – but were the police more than just a willing buyer? Adam is forced to question his idealistic viewpoint when he fears Dizzy might have betrayed him.
6	"A Good Samaritan"	Peter Hoar	Abigail Harvey	24 January 2007	N/A
A convicted murderer claims that, rather than killing the victim, all he actually did was try to help. The students put expert evidence under the microscope. When Sarah and Beth get involved in a case the Crown Prosecution Service passed over, Beth finds herself working for the other side with PC Todd, with unexpected rewards. Ford can't seem to shift the piles of work on his desk but has a good reason for taking so much on.
7	"Grey Area"	Bill Anderson	Paul Logue	31 January 2007	N/A
The students are put to the test by the different claims and counter-claims in a rape case. Rape is a notoriously difficult offence to get a conviction for and they wonder if it's something they should even be looking at. Ford is stumped when Sarah and Andrew want to discuss how to prove that a retired police dog was an unreliable witness.
8	"The Lack of Murder"	Bill Anderson	Oliver Brown	7 February 2007	N/A
The team struggles to prove that a murder case was, in fact, a suicide. Adam gets involved in the mechanics, while the others investigate the victim's state of mind. Ford may know more about the drugs which might have contributed to the victim's death than he is letting on. So he finds himself with several difficult decisions to make – both personally and professionally.

== See also ==
- The Innocence Project, which refers to a number of non-profit legal clinics in the United States
- In Justice, an American TV series with a similar premise
