= Cornelius Dupree =

American exonerated man

Cornelius Dupree Jr.
- Born: September 22, 1959 (age 66)
- Citizenship: United States
- Known for: Miscarriage of justice
- Criminal charge: Robbery – 1979
- Criminal penalty: 75 years imprisonment
- Criminal status: Paroled – Summer 2010; Exonerated – January 2011
- Spouse: Selma Perkins Dupree

Cornelius Dupree Jr. (born September 22, 1959) is an American man who was declared innocent of a 1980 conviction for aggravated robbery, which was alleged to have been committed during a rape in 1979. He was paroled in July 2010 after serving 30 years of a 75-year prison sentence in Texas. Prosecutors cleared him of the crime after a test of his DNA profile did not match traces of semen evidence from the case. Dupree, who was represented by the Innocence Project, spent more time in prison in Texas than any other inmate who was eventually exonerated by DNA evidence.

== Rape and robbery case ==
On November 23, 1979, a 26-year-old woman and a male companion were the victims of a carjacking after visiting a liquor store in Dallas, Texas. The abductors drove the woman to a park nearby, where they raped her. The perpetrators decided not to kill her, but kept her rabbit fur coat. About two days later, two men were seen trying to sell the coat at a grocery store two miles away. The victims' car was found in the parking lot. Dupree and Anthony Massingill were arrested the following month because they resembled suspects from a different sexual assault and robbery case. However, Dupree did not match the description of the perpetrators of the November carjacking.

=== Trial and appeals ===
The 26-year-old victim picked out Dupree and Massingill from a police lineup, but her male companion did not. Dupree was charged with armed robbery and rape, but was never tried on the rape charge. In 1980, he was convicted and sentenced to 75 years in prison for aggravated robbery. Three of Dupree's appeals were rejected by the Texas Court of Criminal Appeals. Two of the appeals were denied because he refused to admit to being a sex offender. He declined early release in 2004 in exchange for attending a treatment program for offenders because he felt it would have amounted to admitting guilt. Dupree later said, "Whatever your truth is, you have to stick with it."

Dupree continued to write letters to people and organizations around the state in his bid to prove his innocence.

=== Exoneration ===
In 2006, the Innocence Project took Dupree's case and carried out a forensic examination of the case evidence in 2010. He was represented by a legal team that included project co-founder Barry Scheck. Dupree was paroled in July 2010 and married his longtime fiancée Selma Perkins the day after his release. Soon afterwards, test results indicated that the evidence contained DNA from two men, neither of whom were Dupree or Massingill. Dallas County District Attorney Craig Watkins stated, "Our Conviction Integrity Unit thoroughly reinvestigated this case, tested the biological evidence and based on the results, concluded Cornelius Dupree did not commit this crime." Under the Tim Cole Compensation Act of Texas, the strongest compensation legislation in the United States, Dupree is entitled to $80,000 for every year in prison, which amounts to $2.4 million, plus a lifetime annuity. The money can be received in a lump sum and is not subject to federal income tax. Massingill was also absolved of the 1979 crime, but remains in prison on a different sexual assault conviction that is also being contested.

Between 2001 and 2011, 41 wrongly convicted prisoners were freed in the state of Texas through DNA testing, more than in any other state.

== See also ==
- Dallas DNA
- Innocence Project of Texas
- List of miscarriage of justice cases
- Overturned convictions in the United States
- Innocent prisoner's dilemma
- List of wrongful convictions in the United States
