= Innocence Network =

Organizations addressing wrongful convictions

The Innocence Network is an affiliation of organizations dedicated to providing pro bono legal and investigative services to individuals seeking to prove innocence of crimes for which they have been convicted and working to redress the causes of wrongful convictions. Most organizations involved are in the United States, covering all 50 states; however, the network includes organizations in Canada, Australia, the Netherlands and the UK.

In 2013, the work of Innocence Network member organizations led to the exoneration of 31 people imprisoned for crimes they did not commit.

== Members ==
- Actual Innocence Clinic at the University of Texas School of Law
- After Innocence
- Alaska Innocence Project
- Arizona Justice Project
- California Innocence Project
- Center on Wrongful Convictions
- Committee for Public Counsel Services Innocence Program
- Connecticut Innocence Project/Post-conviction Unit
- Cooley Law School Innocence Project
- Duke Center for Criminal Justice & Professional Responsibility
- Exoneration Initiative
- George C. Cochran Mississippi Innocence Project
- Georgia Innocence Project
- Great North Innocence Project
- Griffith University Innocence Project
- Hawai'i Innocence Project
- Idaho Innocence Project
- Illinois Innocence Project
- Innocence & Justice Project at the University of New Mexico School of Law
- Innocence Canada
- Innocence Project
- Innocence Project Argentina
- Innocence Project at UVA School of Law
- Innocence Project Brasil
- Innocence Project London
- Innocence Project New Orleans
- Innocence Project New Zealand
- Innocence Project Northwest
- Innocence Project of Florida
- Innocence Project of Iowa
- Innocence Project of Texas
- Irish Innocence Project at Griffith College
- Italy Innocence Project
- Justicia Reinvindicada – Puerto Rico Innocence Project
- Kentucky Innocence Project
- Knoops' Innocence Project
- Life After Innocence
- Loyola Law School Project for the Innocent
- Michigan Innocence Clinic
- Michigan State Appellate Defender Office – Wrongful Conviction Units
- Mid-Atlantic Innocence Project
- Midwest Innocence Project
- Montana Innocence Project
- Nebraska Innocence Project
- New England Innocence Project
- New York Law School Post-Conviction Innocence Clinic
- North Carolina Center on Actual Innocence
- Northern California Innocence Project
- Office of the Ohio Public Defender, Wrongful Conviction Project
- Ohio Innocence Project
- Oklahoma Innocence Project
- Oregon Innocence Project
- Pennsylvania Innocence Project
- Projet Innocence Québec
- Reinvestigation Project
- Resurrection After Exoneration
- Rocky Mountain Innocence Center (RMIC)
- Sellenger Centre Criminal Justice Review Project
- Taiwan Association for Innocence
- The Association in Defence of the Wrongly Convicted (AIDWYC)
- The Israeli Public Defender
- The Hebrew University Of Jerusalem Innocence Project
- Thurgood Marshall School of Law Innocence Project
- University of Baltimore Innocence Project Clinic
- University of British Columbia Innocence Project at the Allard School of Law
- University of Miami Law Innocence Clinic
- Wake Forest University Law School Innocence and Justice Clinic
- West Virginia Innocence Project
- Wisconsin Innocence Project
- Witness to Innocence
- Wrongful Conviction Clinic at Indiana University
