= The Justice Project (Australia) =

The Justice Project Inc. was a non-governmental organisation based in Melbourne, Australia. It was incorporated in 2004 in the run up to the 9 October Federal Election. Its first project was to campaign for refugee policy reform and to campaign for human rights in Australia, including the implementation of the Victorian Charter of Human Rights and Responsibilities Act. These remain the organisation's primary focus. Its founding members include Julian Burnside QC, the Right Honourable Malcolm Fraser, Associate Professor Robert Manne, Hugh Evans (Young Australian of the Year 2004), Professor Gillian Triggs, lawyer and advocate Jessie Taylor, and John Zapris, together with his son Peter, whom also provided their Fitzroy office to conduct their administrative duties.

Following The Justice Project's campaign in last year's Federal election, TJP decided to continue its campaign against mandatory detention, but also, in the next few months, to focus specifically on Victoria's decision to consider a Charter or Bill of Rights. The Justice Project supports the initiative of the Australian Capital Territory in enacting a Human Rights Act in 2004. TJP operates on the premise that this momentum should be continued to all Australian States and Territories, eventually culminating in a constitutionally enshrined Australian Charter of Rights.

== See also ==
- Innocence Project
- Sydney Exoneration Project
