= Kevin Strickland =

American man wrongfully convicted of triple homicide (born 1959)

- Born: Kevin Bernard Strickland; June 7, 1959 (age 67)
- Status: Exonerated (2021)
- Known for: Wrongful murder conviction
- Criminal charges: First-degree murder, two counts of second-degree murder (all overturned)
- Criminal penalty: Life imprisonment with the possibility of parole after 50 years (overturned)

Kevin Bernard Strickland (born June 7, 1959) is an American man who, in 1979, was wrongfully convicted, by an all-white jury, of killing three people in Kansas City, Missouri. No physical evidence linked him to the crime scene and the only alleged witness later recanted her testimony that Strickland was involved, stating that she had been coerced by police. Strickland was given a life sentence. In 2021, he garnered national attention after former prosecutors in his case said that he was innocent and called for his release.

Two black men, who pled guilty to the murders, said that Strickland was not involved, and a fingerprint from the shotgun used in the murders belonged to someone else. Cynthia Douglas, the sole eyewitness to the crime, said detectives pressured her into naming Strickland as a perpetrator. She attempted several times to recant her testimony before her death in 2015.

Numerous legal and political figures called for Strickland's exoneration. In June 2021, the Supreme Court of Missouri denied a petition to have him released. The Governor of Missouri Mike Parson refused to pardon him, saying he did not see his case as a "priority" and was not certain of his innocence. The Missouri Attorney General fought in court to keep him in prison, saying he believed he was guilty.

On November 23, 2021, Judge James Welsh overturned Strickland's conviction "since it was not based on physical evidence but on eye-witness testimony …, who later recanted her account", and Strickland was released on the same day. He was exonerated after more than 42 years in prison, "making his case the longest confirmed wrongful-conviction case in Missouri’s history".

== Crime and trials ==
On April 25, 1978, in Kansas City, Missouri, three people were killed when a group of assailants ransacked a house. The victims were 22-year-old Sherrie Black, 21-year-old Larry Ingram, and 20-year-old John Walker. Another woman, Cynthia Douglas, Ingram's girlfriend, was shot in the leg non-fatally; she pretended to be dead until the attackers left, at which point, she crawled out of the house. All of the victims were tied up and then shot. Kevin Strickland, who was then 18 years old, said at the time he was watching television and talking on the phone, and that the next morning police began accusing him of the murders.

Two suspects, Kilm Adkins and Vincent Bell, were later arrested. Bell was a childhood friend of Strickland's, and lived at a house nearby. Police found a fingerprint belonging to Strickland on Bell's car; Strickland says this was because he had driven the car before, but the last time he had seen Adkins and Bell was at 5 or 6 p.m. on the night of the murders. A fingerprint from the shotgun used in the murders belonged to someone other than Strickland who has not yet been identified. Douglas, the only eyewitness, first stated she could not identify other perpetrators (two other guys) but Adkins and Bell. Later, when police arrested Strickland, she picked out him in a police lineup. Douglas later said she was pressured into naming him as one of the perpetrators by detectives on the case, and until her death in 2015 attempted to have her testimony recanted. In 2009, she emailed the Midwest Innocence Project, saying, "I am seeking info on how to help someone that was wrongfully accused. I was the only eyewitness and things were not clear back then, but now I know more and would like to help this person if I can." Douglas said police told her, "Just pick Strickland out of the lineup and we'll be done, it will all go away, you can go on and you don’t have to worry about these guys no more." Adkins and Bell confessed to the murders, but said Strickland was not a participant.

Strickland's first trial ended in a hung jury, with the only black juror refusing to find him guilty. According to Strickland, after the trial, the prosecutor approached his lawyer and said "I'll make sure this doesn't happen next time." Strickland's current lawyer, Tricia Rojo Bushnell of the Midwest Innocence Project, said the prosecutor used each of his peremptory challenges to strike black jurors, resulting in the next trial having an all-white jury.

Strickland was convicted in 1979, one year after being arrested, and sentenced to life imprisonment without the chance of parole for 50 years. Adkins and Bell later cut plea bargains, pled guilty and were sentenced to 20 years, each of them serving less than 10 years. Others were suspected but not charged. Strickland tried to appeal in 1980, but it was dismissed by Supreme Court of Missouri.

== Calls for release ==
Strickland was the subject of an investigation by The Kansas City Star in September 2020, which prompted prosecutors to review the case. On May 10, 2021, Jackson County prosecutor Jean Peters Baker published a letter saying she believed he was innocent and should be released from prison. Former prosecutors in Strickland's case have said they think he is innocent as well, as have federal prosecutors for the United States District Court for the Western District of Missouri. Mayor of Kansas City Quinton Lucas and more than a dozen state lawmakers, including Andrew McDaniel, the Republican chair to the Missouri House of Representatives' committee overseeing prisons, have sought to have him released.

The Supreme Court of Missouri denied a petition to release Strickland in June 2021. In August 2021, Governor of Missouri Mike Parson refused to pardon him, having previously said that Strickland's case was not a "priority" and that he was not sure of Strickland's innocence. The editorial board of The Washington Post, as well as some prominent Democratic Party figures, negatively contrasted Parson's decision not to pardon Strickland with his choice to pardon Patricia and Mark McCloskey, the couple involved in the June 2020 brandishing weapons against protesters controversy. Assistant attorney general of Missouri, Andrew Clarke, said the attorney general's office believes Strickland to be guilty and thinks he should remain in prison, saying that Strickland had "worked to evade responsibility." In August 2021, the attorney general's office issued Baker a subpoena requiring her to turn over any communication with third parties regarding Strickland. Baker termed that action as harassment.

== Hearing leading to exoneration ==
In November 2021, Baker coordinated a three-day hearing, to present the case for the reversal of Strickland's verdicts. She said, "One of the reasons I'm proud of this system, and one of the reasons I know that it is one of the best systems in the world even when we stand amid a terrible mistake, is because we have built into our system an ability to correct wrongs." "I now trust in you to return just a fraction of what we've all lost, what Mr. Strickland lost, by bringing him home." The last of a dozen witnesses, former Missouri Supreme Court Chief Justice Edward D. Robertson Jr., argued that the preserved subsequent testimony and frequent recantations of her pre-trial interviews and trial testimony by Cynthia Douglas, upon whose word the entire original persuasive evidence of guilt rested, also constituted "the entire case" for the reversals.

Judge James Welsh wrote on November 23, 2021, after Strickland had spent more than 42 years in prison: "Under these unique circumstances, the Court's confidence in Strickland's conviction is so undermined that it cannot stand, and the judgment of conviction must be set aside. The State of Missouri shall immediately discharge Kevin Bernard Strickland from its custody."

== Personal life ==
Kevin Strickland was born on June 7, 1959, and is the father of one daughter. Strickland uses a wheelchair and said that he had "experienced a couple of heart attacks... I got high blood pressure. My ability to stand is diminished." His father died in 2011. His mother, Rosetta Thornton died on August 21, 2021, mere months before his exoneration. Prior to his exoneration, Strickland said upon his release that he wanted to see the ocean.

== Compensation ==
Though Kevin Strickland served the longest prison time wrongfully convicted in Missouri's history, he did not qualify for compensation from the state, because the law allows it only if an exoneration is based on DNA evidence. However, the Midwest Innocence Project initiated a fundraising campaign for him through GoFundMe in June 2021, which raised more than $200,000 by the time of his release. If his case qualified for state compensation, the amount could be much more; in other states compensation of over $20 million was paid in similar cases. In few days after his release, donations multiplied and the raised amount went over $1 million by more than 14,000 people.
