= Douglas Echols =

American convicted and later exonerated of rape

Douglas Echols was convicted in a 1986 rape case. In 2002, his charges were finally cleared through DNA testing after he served over five years in prison. In 2005, a resolution was introduced in the Georgia Assembly by Representatives Tom Bordeaux and Chuck Sims requesting $1.6 million as compensation for his incarceration; however, the resolution was not approved.

== The charges ==
On February 1, 1986, a young woman, Donna Givens, was leaving a Savannah nightclub in the early hours of the morning. As she left, three men accosted her, forced her into a car and drove her into an unknown neighborhood. Two of the men brought her into a house and raped her. Later, while they were arguing, Givens managed to escape and called the police. When asked to show police the location of her rape, Givens brought police to the house of Samuel Scott, where he and Echols were inside. She identified Echols as the man who held her down during the rape (this identification may have been based on suggestive ID procedures by the police including photo displays). Scott fled the scene because he had cocaine on him. Echols gave a false name. Even though Echols and Scott claimed mistaken identity and had two people testify to their whereabouts at the time of the incident, the court convicted them both based on Givens’ eyewitness identification and identification of the house. In the trial, Echols refused to testify against Scott. On March 26, 1987, Scott received a life sentence plus 20 years. Echols received concurrent sentences of 15 years for rape, 15 years for kidnapping, and one year for false statement.

== Prison life ==
For the next five years, Echols endured prison for a crime he was convicted of committing. When he motioned for a rehearing, the Court of Appeals of Georgia affirmed the convictions and denied the motion in February 1988. He was finally released in 1992 on parole, finding his life entirely different from his pre-prison life. Before the conviction, Echols was a staff sergeant with 10 years in the Army from which he was dishonorably discharged upon being convicted. This denied him military benefits such as medical treatment. While in prison, his marriage also ended. The 5’3" Echols endured violent, and often sexual, assaults from others in prison including being stabbed with a screwdriver.

== Exoneration ==
In 1996, after having served 5 years in prison for a rape conviction, Douglas Echols read about the Innocence Project, a non-profit organization dedicated to freeing the wrongfully convicted. Although Echols had been released from prison, his charges had not been cleared. The Innocence Project agreed to take on his case and, in February 2001, finally got permission to do DNA testing on the rape kit evidence. In July 2001, extensive DNA testing of Echols and co-defendant Samuel Scott showed that they could not have contributed the spermatozoa from the vaginal swabs. After revealing this evidence, prosecutors changed their theory of the case. They said perhaps the rape victim, Donna Givens, had consensual sex around the same time. The Innocence Project investigated the claim and found it to be untrue. Finally, in October 2002, Echols and Scott became the second and third Georgia prisoners to be exonerated and the charges of rape were lifted.

== After prison ==
Once out of prison, Echols had few job skills and did not apply for a driver's license because he worried he would be stopped by police and sent back to prison.

In 2000, Echols was arrested in Memphis for being outside of his parole. Although he had been allowed to move to Mississippi to set up a home remodelling business, he had not reported to his parole officer for two years and an arrest warrant was issued. Echols claims that he thought his parole had ended. He served two more years in prison.

Finally, in 2002, Echols was cleared of the charges which had ruined the previous sixteen years of his life. However, despite being cleared, he has received no compensation or apology from the state. On February 23, 2005, a bill was introduced in the Georgia legislature to compensate Echols by ordering the Department of Corrections to award $1.6 million to Douglas Echols as compensation for wrongful conviction. However, the bill did not pass the legislature. Echols has yet to receive compensation from the state of Georgia.

== See also ==
- List of wrongful convictions in the United States
