= The Innocent Man: Murder and Injustice in a Small Town =

2006 true crime book by John Grisham

The Innocent Man
- Book Cover
- Author: John Grisham
- Publisher: Doubleday
- Publication date: October 10, 2006
- Publication place: United States
- Pages: 368
- ISBN: 978-0-385-51723-2
- OCLC: 70251230

The Innocent Man: Murder and Injustice in a Small Town is a 2006 true crime book by John Grisham, his first nonfiction title. The book tells the story of Ronald 'Ron' Keith Williamson of Ada, Oklahoma, a former minor league baseball player who was wrongly convicted in 1988 of the rape and murder of Debra Sue Carter in Ada and was sentenced to death. After serving 11 years on death row, he was exonerated by DNA evidence and other material introduced by the Innocence Project and was released in 1999.

Netflix released The Innocent Man, a six-part documentary series based on the book, in December 2018.

== Plot ==
Ron Keith Williamson has returned to his hometown of Ada, Oklahoma, after multiple failed attempts to play for various minor league baseball teams affiliated with the Oakland Athletics and the New York Yankees. Lasting pain from a shoulder injury incurred during his career leaves him unable to find steady employment. His failures only serve to aggravate his depression, and he quickly slips into alcoholism.

Early in the morning of December 8, 1982, the body of Debra Sue Carter, a 21-year-old cocktail waitress, was found in the bedroom of her garage apartment in Ada. She had been beaten, raped, and suffocated. After five years of false starts due to shoddy investigative work by the small and underfunded Ada police force, Williamson, along with his "drinking buddy", Dennis Fritz, was charged, tried, and convicted of the rape and murder charges in 1988. On conviction, he was sentenced to death, while Fritz was given a life sentence. Fritz's wife had been murdered seven years earlier and he was raising their only daughter when he was arrested.

Grisham's book describes the aggressive and misguided mission of the police and Pontotoc County District Attorney Bill Peterson to solve the mystery of Carter's murder. Police and prosecutors use forced "dream" confessions, unreliable witnesses, and flimsy evidence to convict Williamson and Fritz to the crime. Since a death penalty conviction automatically sets in motion a series of appeals, the Innocence Project aided Williamson's attorney, Mark Barrett, in exposing several glaring holes in the prosecution's case and the credibility of the prosecution's witnesses. Frank H. Seay, a U.S. District Court judge, ordered a retrial.

After eleven years on death row, Williamson and Fritz were exonerated by DNA evidence and released on April 15, 1999. Williamson was the 78th inmate released from death row since 1973.

Williamson suffered deep and irreversible psychological damage during his incarceration and lengthy stay on death row. For example, on September 22, 1994, he was five days away from being executed when his execution was stayed following the filing of a habeas corpus petition.

He was intermittently treated for manic depression, personality disorders, alcoholism, and mild schizophrenia. It was later proven that he was mentally ill and therefore was unfit to have been tried or sentenced to death in the first place. The State of Oklahoma, the city of Ada, and Pontotoc County officials never admitted any errors and threatened to re-arrest him.

Another man from Ada, Glen Gore, was eventually convicted of the crime on June 24, 2003. He was sentenced to death, but his sentence was overturned in August 2005. He was convicted at a second trial on June 21, 2006, and sentenced to life in prison without parole. This was required by law due to a jury deadlock on sentencing.

Williamson and Fritz sued and won a settlement of $500,000 in 2003 for wrongful conviction from the City of Ada, and an out-of-court settlement with the State of Oklahoma for an undisclosed amount. Williamson was later diagnosed with cirrhosis of the liver due to decades of alcohol abuse. He died on December 4, 2004, in a Broken Arrow, Oklahoma, nursing home. Fritz returned to Kansas City, where he reunited with his daughter, Elizabeth, as of 2006. In 2006, Fritz published his own account of being wrongly convicted in his book titled Journey Toward Justice.

Further highlighting the failures and abuses perpetrated by the police and district attorney's office during that time period, The Innocent Man includes accounts (as subplots) of the false conviction, trial, and sentencing of Tommy Ward and Karl Fontenot in the abduction, rape, and purported murder of Denice Haraway, as well as the false conviction of Greg Wilhoit in the rape and murder of his estranged wife, Kathy. At one time, all the men were incarcerated on the same death row. About two decades before Grisham's book, Ward and Fontenot's wrongful convictions were detailed in the book The Dreams of Ada (1987) by Robert Mayer.

== See also ==
- List of wrongful convictions in the United States
