= The Innocent Man (American TV series) =

Television series

- Genre: Documentary
- Created by: Ross M. Dinerstein; Clay Tweel
- Directed by: Clay Tweel
- No. of seasons: 1
- No. of episodes: 6

Production
- Executive producers: Ross M. Dinerstein; David Gernert; John Grisham; Clay Tweel
- Running time: 42–52 minutes
- Production companies: Campfire; The Gernert Company

Original release
- Network: Netflix
- Release: December 14, 2018

The Innocent Man is an American true crime documentary television series based on John Grisham's 2006 book The Innocent Man: Murder and Injustice in a Small Town. The six-episode first season debuted on Netflix on December 14, 2018.

Like Grisham's nonfiction book, the series follows two murder cases in Ada, Oklahoma, between 1982 and 1984. The cases examine the potential false confessions of Ron Williamson, Dennis Fritz, Tommy Ward, and Karl Fontenot.

== Episodes ==
No.	Title	Original release date
1	"Debbie and Denice"	December 14, 2018
2	"In Dreams"	December 14, 2018
3	"Rotten to the Core"	December 14, 2018
4	"Corpus Delicti"	December 14, 2018
5	"Smoking Guns"	December 14, 2018
6	"Snow Storm"	December 14, 2018

== Reception ==
Upon its release, the show received mixed reviews from critics. On the review aggregator Rotten Tomatoes, the series has a 69% approval rating based on 13 reviews, with an average rating of 7.0 out of 10. The site's critical consensus says, "The Innocent Man will satisfy true crime aficionados looking for a slickly packaged mystery, but viewers seeking a more probing deconstruction of the justice system may come away disappointed." On Metacritic, the series has a weighted score of 57 out of 100, based on 4 critics, indicating "mixed or average reviews".

== See also ==
- List of wrongful convictions in the United States
