= Ken Wyniemko =

American wrongly convicted of rape

Ken Wyniemko is one of two former prisoners in Michigan released on DNA evidence with help from the Innocence Project.

Wyniemko was convicted of first-degree criminal sexual misconduct on circumstantial evidence and the testimony of a prisoner informant, Glen McCormick, who now admits he lied in order to avoid life in prison. DNA testing was not regularly performed at the time, but even the primitive blood tests of the time indicated that Wyniemko was not the perpetrator of the crime.

Unlike most convicts, Wyniemko held on to all the paperwork relating to his arrest and trial. He spent almost a decade in jail, until he contacted the Innocence Project at the Thomas M. Cooley Law School.

Since being released, Wyniemko has spoken at various colleges, such as Wayne State University and the Michigan State University College of Law, about his experience as a wrongfully convicted man. He often wears black clothes and a gold crucifix. Wyniemko believes that at least 1 of 10 persons behind bars are innocent of the crimes of which they were convicted.

A civil suit, Wyniemko v. Clinton Township, was settled out of court for $3.7 million. Wyniemko now "plans to attend law school, doesn't count out a run for office someday."

In August 2008, prosecutors announced that DNA evidence had tied another man, Craig Gonser, to the crime for which Wyniemko had been convicted, but that Gonser could not be tried because the statute of limitations had expired.

== See also ==
- List of wrongful convictions in the United States
