= SODDI defense =

Informal term for legal defense

The SODDI defense ("Some Other Dude Did It" or "Some Other Dude Done It") is an informal phrase referring to a legal defense argument in which the defendant does not deny that a crime (e.g., murder or assault) occurred and is not asserting self-defense, but rather is asserting that they are not the one who did it. It is also known as the alternate suspect defense. The SODDI defense in a murder, rape or assault case is often accompanied by a mistaken identity defense and/or an alibi defense. Another common scenario where the SODDI defense is available is where the police find contraband in a car or residence containing multiple people. In this scenario, each person present could assert that one of the other people possessed the contraband.

In Holmes v. South Carolina, 547 U.S. 319, 126 S. Ct. 1727, 1731, 164 L. Ed. 2d 503 (2006), the US Supreme Court held that a South Carolina statute that prohibited putting on a SODDI defense when the state's case was "strong" violated the Sixth Amendment right to put on a defense.

== See also ==
- Shaggy defense
- Trojan horse defense
