= Innocence Project =

American legal non-profit (founded 1992)

Innocence Project, Inc.

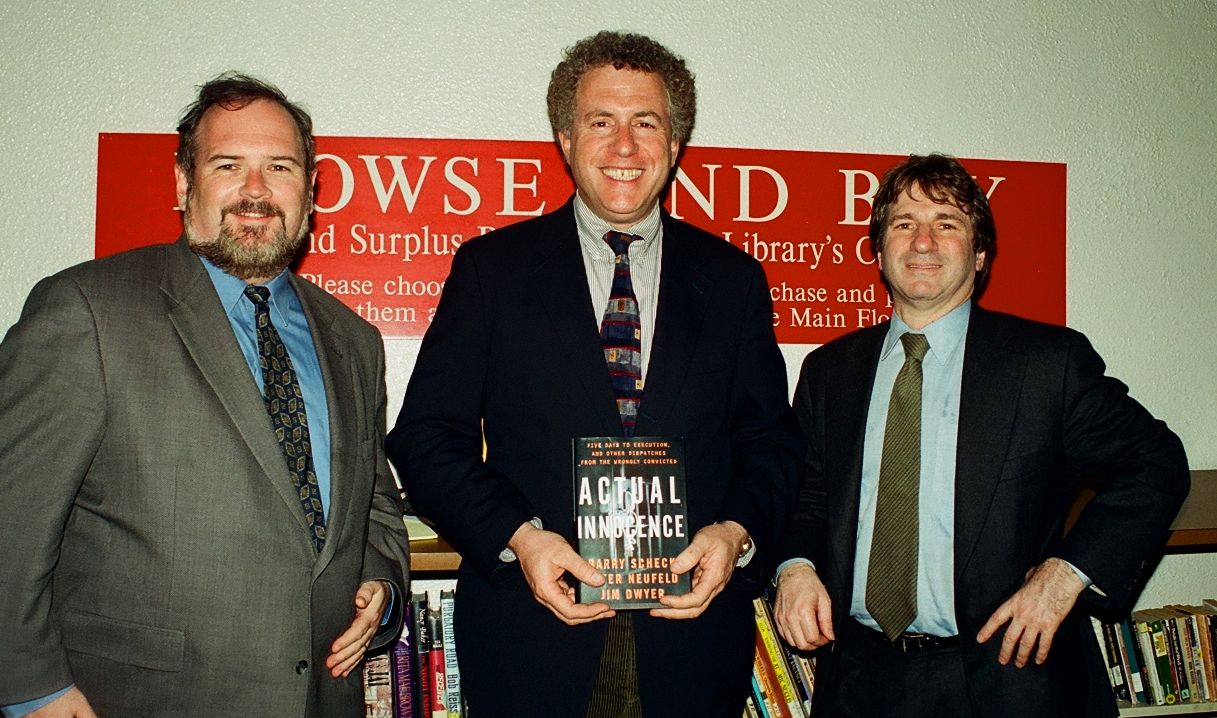
- Left to right: journalist Jim Dwyer, founders Peter Neufeld and Barry Scheck
- Formation: 1992; 34 years ago
- Founder: Barry Scheck; Peter Neufeld
- Type: Nonprofit organization
- Tax ID no.: 32-0077563
- Legal status: 501(c)(3)
- Purpose: Exoneration; Justice reform
- Headquarters: 40 Worth Street, New York, NY 10013
- Region served: United States
- Executive Director: Christina Swarns
- Chair: Jack Taylor
- Affiliations: The Innocence Network
- Revenue: $21,373,256 (2020)
- Expenses: $15,944,005 (2020)
- Endowment: $21,620,304 (2020)
- Employees: 91 (2020)
- Volunteers: 22 (2020)
- Website: innocenceproject.org

Innocence Project, Inc. is a 501(c)(3) nonprofit legal organization that uses DNA testing and other forms of post-conviction relief to exonerate and free prisoners who they believe have been wrongly convicted. The organization also advocates for criminal justice reform to prevent future injustice. The group cites various studies estimating that in the United States between 1% and 10% of all prisoners are innocent. The Innocence Project was founded in 1992 by attorneys Barry Scheck and Peter Neufeld, who gained national attention in the mid-1990s as part of the "Dream Team" of lawyers who formed part of the defense in the O. J. Simpson murder case.

As of 2025, the Innocence Project has participated in successfully overturned 254 convictions through DNA-based exonerations, and has confirmed guilt in about 40% of the cases they closely examined. In 2021, the Innocence Project received the biennial Milton Friedman Prize for Advancing Liberty from the Cato Institute, awarded in recognition and gratitude for its work to ensure liberty and justice for all. In March 2022, the Innocence Project won two Webby Awards for its Happiest Moments video, winning the Best Humanitarian & Services campaign in both the brand and non-profit categories. Happiest Moments was the organization's first public service announcement, premiering in June 2021 and produced by Hayden5.

== Founding ==
Logo used from 1992 to 2018

The Innocence Project was established in the wake of a study by the U.S. Department of Justice and U.S. Senate, in conjunction with Yeshiva University's Benjamin N. Cardozo School of Law, which found that incorrect identification by eyewitnesses was a factor in over 70% of wrongful convictions. The Innocence Project was founded in 1992 by Scheck and Neufeld as part of a law clinic at Cardozo. The organization became an independent 501(c)(3) nonprofit organization on January 28, 2003, but it maintains institutional connections with Cardozo. Madeline deLone was the executive director from 2004 until 2020, succeeded by Christina Swarns, who argues before the United States Supreme Court before joining the group, on September 8, 2020.

The Innocence Project is the headquarters of the Innocence Network, a group of about 70 independent organizations worldwide with similar goals. One such example exists in the Republic of Ireland, where in 2009 a project was set up at Griffith College Dublin.

== Mission ==
The Innocence Project's self-stated mission is "to free the staggering number of innocent people who remain incarcerated, and to bring reform to the system responsible for their unjust imprisonment."

The Innocence Project focuses exclusively on post-conviction appeals in which DNA evidence is available to be tested or retested. DNA testing is possible in 5–10% of criminal cases. Other members of the Innocence Network also help to exonerate those in whose cases DNA testing is not possible.

In addition to working on behalf of those who may have been wrongfully convicted of crimes throughout the United States, those working for the Innocence Project perform research and advocacy related to the causes of wrongful convictions.

Some of the Innocence Project's successes have resulted in releasing people from death row. The successes of the project have helped inspire opposition to the death penalty, and have likely been a factor in the decision by some American states to institute moratoria on criminal executions.

In District Attorney's Office v. Osborne (2009), U.S. Supreme Court Chief Justice Roberts wrote that post-conviction challenge "poses questions to our criminal justice systems and our traditional notions of finality better left to elected officials than federal judges." In the opinion, another justice wrote that forensic science has "serious deficiencies." Roberts also said that post-conviction DNA testing risks "unnecessarily overthrowing the established system of criminal justice." Law professor Kevin Jon Heller wrote: "[Post-conviction challenges] might lead to a reasonably accurate [legal system]."

As of June 2018, the Innocence Project's funding sources include 55% from individual contributions, 16% from foundations, 16% from events, 8% from investments, and 5% from corporations, Yeshiva University, and other sources.

== Work ==
The Innocence Project originated in New York City but accepts cases from other parts of the country. (Note: Intake is currently closed in Arizona, California, Illinois, Michigan, Ohio, and Puerto Rico) The majority of clients helped are of low socio-economic status and have used all possible legal options for justice. Many clients hope that DNA evidence will prove their innocence, as the emergence of DNA testing allows those who claim to have been wrongly convicted of crimes to challenge their cases. The Innocence Project also works with the local, state and federal levels of law enforcement, legislators, and other programs to prevent further wrongful convictions.

All potential clients go through an extensive screening process to determine whether or not they are likely to be innocent. If they pass the process, the Innocence Project takes up their case, resources permitting. About 2,400 prisoners write to the Innocence Project annually, and at any given time the Innocence Project is evaluating 6,000 to 8,000 potential cases. In addition to their co-directors and a managing attorney, the Innocence Project has six full-time staff attorneys and nearly 300 active cases.

In almost half of the cases that the Innocence Project takes on, the clients' guilt is reconfirmed by DNA testing. Of all the cases taken on by the Innocence Project so far, about 43% of clients were proven innocent, 42% were confirmed guilty, and evidence was inconclusive and not probative in 15% of cases. In about 40% of all DNA exoneration cases, law enforcement officials identified the actual perpetrator based on the same DNA test results that led to an exoneration. Overall, the Innocence Project's DNA exonerations identified several contributors of wrongful convictions, including mistaken eyewitness identifications, invalid forensic science, false confessions, informants who lied, and government misconduct.

== Overturned convictions ==
As of January 2022, 375 people previously convicted of serious crimes in the United States had been exonerated by DNA testing since 1989, 21 of whom had been sentenced to death. Almost all (99%) of the wrongful convictions involved male defendants with minority groups making up approximately 70% (61% African American and 8% Latino). The National Registry of Exonerations lists 2,939 convicted defendants who were exonerated through DNA and non-DNA evidence from January, 1989 through January, 2022 with more than 25,600 years imprisoned.

According to a study published in 2014, if all death row inmates were kept on death row indefinitely, at least 4.1% of them would eventually be legally exonerated. This statistic would include death row inmates who otherwise would've had their sentences commuted or reduced to appeal and death row inmates who were actually guilty, but were still legally exonerated.

The following are some examples of exonerations that the Innocence Project helped bring about:

- Steven Avery was exonerated in 2003 after serving 18 years in prison for sexual assault. A few years after his release, he was convicted of raping and murdering a woman in an unrelated case, and sentenced to life in prison without parole.
- Jarrett M. Adams was wrongfully convicted of sexual assault in Wisconsin in 1998 at age 17. With the assistance of the Wisconsin Innocence Project, the Seventh Circuit United States Court of Appeals overturned his conviction in 2006 on grounds of ineffective assistance of counsel. Following his exoneration, Adams earned a J.D. from Loyola University Chicago School of Law and became the first exoneree ever hired as a staff attorney by the Innocence Project. He later founded the Law Office of Jarrett Adams, PLLC and co-founded Life After Justice, a nonprofit supporting exonerees.
- Cornelius Dupree was convicted of sexual assault and robbery in 1980 and was exonerated in 2011 by the Innocence Project through DNA evidence.
- Douglas Echols and Samuel Scott were convicted in 1987 of sexual assault and robbery, and exonerated in 2002 by DNA evidence by the Innocence Project.
- Clarence Elkins was convicted in 1999 for rape and murder, and exonerated by DNA evidence in 2005; defended by Ohio Innocence Project.
- Ryan Ferguson was convicted in 2005 for a 2001 murder, and exonerated in 2013 because the prosecution withheld exculpatory evidence and the witnesses who testified against him recanted their testimony; defended by Missouri Innocence Project.
- Glenn Ford was exonerated in 2014 in the murder of Isadore Newman. Ford, an African American, had been convicted by an all-white jury without any physical evidence linking him to the crime and with testimony withheld. He served 30 years on death row in Angola Prison before his release.
- Darryl Hunt was exonerated in 2004 after serving 19 1/2 years in prison of a life sentence for the rape and murder of a newspaper copy editor, Deborah Sykes.
- Michael Morton was convicted of murder in 1987, spent over 24 years in prison, and exonerated through DNA and withholding of evidence in 2011 with help from the Innocence Project. In 2013 his prosecutor was convicted of withholding evidence, agreed to disbarment, and spent 4 days in jail.
- James Calvin Tillman was exonerated in 2007 after an investigation begun by the Innocence Project, and after serving 16 1/2 years in prison for a rape he did not commit. His sentence was 45 years.
- Archie Williams was convicted in 1983 of sexual assault and sentenced to life without the possibility of parole, but was exonerated in 2019 due to DNA evidence after over three decades in prison.
- Ken Wyniemko was convicted in 1994 of sexual assault, and exonerated in 2003 through DNA evidence by the Innocence Project.
- Michael Sutton and Kenny Phillips went out for Phillips' birthday in May 2006, they were wrongfully arrested and incarcerated for 15 years. In 2023, their attempted murder convictions were overturned and the University of Akron granted them full scholarships to earn their college degrees.
- Leonard Mack was exonerated of rape and gun charges after 47 years due to DNA evidence. The wrongful conviction of Mack, who served 7 years in prison, was the longest to be vacated due to advanced DNA testing.
- Perry Lott served 30 years in prison for rape and burglary charges before being cleared after DNA testing.

== Innocence Network ==
The Innocence Project is a founding member of the Innocence Network, a coalition of independent organizations and advocates, including law schools, journalism schools, and public defense offices that collaborate to help convicted felons prove their innocence. As of 2021, there were 68 organizations in the network, operating in all 50 US states and 12 other countries, and had helped exonerate 625 people.

In South Africa, the Wits Justice Project investigates South African incarcerations. In partnership with the Wits Law Clinic, the Julia Mashele Trust, the Legal Resources Centre (LRC), the Open Democracy Advice Centre (ODAC), the US Innocence Project, and the Justice Project investigate individual cases of prisoners wrongly convicted or awaiting trial.

== In popular culture ==
The Innocence Project is shown in a variety of areas in popular culture. Below is a non-exhaustive list of some examples that this organization has been shown in.

=== Film ===
- After Innocence (2005) is a documentary featuring the stories of eight wrongfully convicted men who were exonerated by the Innocence Project.
- Conviction (2010) is a film about the exoneration of Kenneth Waters, who was a client of the Innocence Project. Hilary Swank plays Waters' sister Betty Anne, who went to college and law school to fight for his freedom, and Sam Rockwell plays Waters. Barry Scheck is portrayed by Peter Gallagher.
- Happiest Moments (2021) is a Webby Award winning video by Innocence Project. Its the organization's first-ever public service announcement, produced by Hayden5.

=== Literature ===
- In his nonfiction book The Innocent Man: Murder and Injustice in a Small Town (2006), John Grisham recounted the cases of Ron Williamson and Dennis Fritz, who were assisted on appeal by the Innocence Project and freed by DNA evidence after being wrongfully convicted of the murder of Debra Ann Carter.

=== Podcasts ===
- Serial in its first season referenced the Innocence Project in episode 7 when Deirdre Enright, director of investigation for the Innocence Project at the University of Virginia School of Law, and a team of law students analyzed the case against Adnan Syed.

=== Television ===
- Castle, an American television series, in the episode "Like Father, Like Daughter" (season 6, episode 7), mentioned the Innocence Project, as well as Frank Henson who was wrongfully convicted in 1998 of the death of Kimberly Tolbert.
- The Innocence Project, a BBC One drama series that aired from 2006 to 2007, is based on a UK version of the organization.
- The Innocence Project was discussed in season 2, episode 9 of The Good Wife, "Nine Hours" (December 14, 2010). Project co-founder Barry Scheck played himself in the episode, which was largely based on the actual Innocence Project case of Cameron Todd Willingham. Cary Agos, a recurring character on The Good Wife, is written to have worked for the Innocence Project after law school (and is a family friend of Scheck's).
- In season six of Suits, a US legal dramedy, law student and paralegal Rachel Zane takes on an Innocence Project for a man wrongfully accused of murder.
- In season three of Riverdale, a dark reimagining of the Archie Comics universe, Veronica Lodge mentions starting a chapter of the organization to help free her boyfriend Archie Andrews from prison following being falsely convicted of murder.
- Making a Murderer, a two-season (of 10 episodes each) documentary relating Steven Avery wrongful conviction. The episodes were released on Netflix between 2015 and 2018.
- The Innocence Files (2020) is a series of nine documentary films based on the work of the Innocence Project, released on Netflix in April 2020.
- Quantum Leap, in the episode "Ben Song for the Defense" the Innocence Project is mentioned after Ben, having leapt into a public defender, successfully defends a teenager wrongfully accused of killing a gang recruiter.
- The Innocent Man (2018) is a Netflix mini series composed of six episodes based on the Grisham nonfiction book The Innocent Man: Murder and Injustice in a Small Town.
- Psych, an American television series, the episode "True Grits" (season 6, episode 15), featured a character exonerated by the Innocence Project.

== Other similar organizations ==
These organizations are similar in nature of focusing on wrongful convictions, fair treatment, and helping reduce recidivism. They are not DNA specific, unlike the Innocence Project.

- Equal Justice Initiative (EJI): Founded by Lawyer Bryan Stevenson, this nonprofit works to free innocent people from prison, highlighting death row. Many of it involves fighting racial injustice.
- Southern Center for Human Rights (SCHR): Focuses around providing legal representation to people with harsh sentences or facing the death penalty in the South. They also focus on fair trials and prisoner rights.
- The Exoneration Project (University of Chicago): A legal clinic ran by law students and lawyers which focuses on exposing police misconduct, fixing unfair trials, and proving innocence through evidence.
- Centurion (formerly Centurion Ministries): One of the oldest innocence organizations, having been founded in 1983, they focus on non-DNA innocence cases through long-term investigations.
- The Sentencing Project: Doesn't focus on cases itself, but the overall picture by working to change policies and laws which result in unfair prison sentences.
- REFORM Alliance: Focuses on the probation and parole system and improving re-entry into civilization so that people can stay out of prison once out.
- The Last Mile: Gives job training and education while in prison to help the futures of inmates once out of prison.

== See also ==
- Innocent prisoner's dilemma
- List of miscarriage of justice cases
- List of wrongful convictions in the United States
- Miscarriage of justice

=== Related groups and regional chapters ===
- International Innocence Project Directory
- Alaska Innocence Project
- California Innocence Project
- Georgia Innocence Project
- Illinois Innocence Project
- Innocence Canada
- Investigating Innocence
- The Justice Project (Australia)
- Medill Innocence Project, Illinois
- Nebraska Innocence Project
- Sydney Exoneration Project (Australia)
