= Mistaken identity (defense) =

Legal defense

Mistaken identity is a defense in criminal law which claims the actual innocence of the criminal defendant, and attempts to undermine evidence of guilt by asserting mistakes in eyewitness identification: any eyewitness to the crime incorrectly thought that they saw the defendant, when in fact the person seen by the witness was someone else. The defendant may question both the memory of the witness (suggesting, for example, that the identification is the result of a false memory), and the perception of the witness (suggesting, for example, that the witness had poor eyesight, or that the crime occurred in a poorly lit place).

Because the prosecution in a criminal case must prove the guilt of the accused beyond a reasonable doubt, the defendant must convince the jury that there is reasonable doubt about whether the witness actually saw what they claim to have seen, or recalls having seen. Although scientific studies have shown that mistaken identity is a common phenomenon, jurors give very strong credence to eyewitness testimony, particularly where the eyewitness is resolute in believing that their identification of the defendant was correct.

With genetic fingerprinting and DNA evidence now commonplace, many convictions based on eyewitness testimony are being re-examined. According to the Innocence Project, 73% of the cases of DNA exonerations have involved mistaken eyewitness identification.

== Notable cases ==
Abraham Lincoln used mistaken identity as a defense for William "Duff" Armstrong in 1858. He referred to a farmer's almanac to prove that a witness could not have seen Armstrong in the moonlight, as claimed, because the position of the moon that night would not have provided sufficient illumination. Armstrong was acquitted.

Clarence Elkins was wrongfully convicted of the 1998 rape and murder of his mother-in-law. He was exonerated after serving 6.5 years in prison.

=== Adolf Beck ===
A famous case of mistaken identity in the United Kingdom is the case of Adolf Beck, who served several years in prison as a swindler, was released upon completion of his sentence, and then arrested again on the same charges before the actual swindler of similar appearance was apprehended.

=== Ronald Cotton ===
Another case demonstrating mistaken identity is the case of Ronald Cotton. In July 1984, a man broke into Jennifer Thompson's home in Burlington, North Carolina and raped her. During the attack, she studied the attacker's face, determined to identify him if she survived the attack. When presented with a photo lineup, she identified Cotton as her attacker. Twice, she testified against him by saying she had identified him. Cotton was found guilty of rape and burglary and sentenced to life plus 54 years in prison.

In March 1995, Cotton's lawyers had the DNA in Thompson's rape kit retested, which found that his DNA was not present, resulting in Cotton being exonerated and freed. Authorities also tested the DNA in the rape kit of Mary Williams, who was raped by the same assailant as Thompson on the very same night, and the DNA was found to be that of Bobby Poole, another inmate in the prison where Cotton was incarcerated; Poole had also boasted to his fellow inmates that he had committed the crimes for which Cotton was convicted. Poole confessed to raping both Thompson and Williams and was sentenced to 70 years in prison. He died of cancer in prison in 2000.

Thompson has since become a critic of eyewitness testimony because of its proven unreliability. She was filled with remorse after learning that she had contributed to Cotton, an innocent man, being convicted and sent to prison. Upon release for wrongful conviction (proved by DNA analysis), Cotton was awarded $110,000 in compensation from the state of North Carolina. Cotton and Thompson reconciled and became close friends; they conduct speaking tours to promote reform of procedures for eyewitness testimony.

== See also ==
- SODDI defense
- Shaggy defense
- Gaslighting
