= Ron Williamson =

American baseball player wrongly convicted of murder (1953–2004)

Ron Williamson mugshot

Ronald Keith Williamson (February 3, 1953 – December 4, 2004) was an American former minor league baseball catcher and pitcher, who was one of two men wrongly convicted in 1988 in Oklahoma for the rape and murder of Debra Sue "Debbie" Carter. His former friend Dennis Fritz was sentenced to life imprisonment, while Williamson was sentenced to death. Both were released 11 years later when DNA evidence proved their innocence. Their story became the subject of bestselling author John Grisham's first nonfiction book, The Innocent Man: Murder and Injustice in a Small Town (2006), and the adapted Netflix docu-series of the same name.

== Early life and career ==
Born and raised in Ada, Oklahoma, Williamson was the youngest of three children and the only son. He was a standout athlete even when very young and excelled in several sports, although his primary interest was baseball.

He played baseball at Asher High School, where his parents had moved so that he could play under the school's legendary coach, Murl Bowen. After hitting .500 in the state championships his senior year, he was the 41st pick in baseball's 1971 amateur draft, a second-round selection by the Oakland Athletics.

Forgoing a scholarship offer from the University of Oklahoma, Williamson signed and spent the 1972 season primarily with the Coos Bay-North Bend A's, hitting .265 in 52 games. In 1973, he hit .137 for the Key West Conchs with 13 runs produced in 59 games.

A shoulder injury derailed his career for the next few years. Williamson's father, through a childhood friendship with former major league pitcher Harry Brecheen, got him a look with the New York Yankees, where he was converted to a pitcher in their minor league system for parts of 1976 and 1977, but recurring shoulder problems limited his appearances and effectiveness. In his last season, he pitched in 14 games, working 33 innings.

At the age of 24, his once-promising baseball career was over. After returning to Oklahoma, Williamson held several other jobs. He became addicted to drugs and alcohol and suffered from increasingly severe mental illness, becoming depressed and living with his mother Juanita.

== Arrest and conviction ==
On December 8, 1982, Debbie "Debra Sue" Carter, after visiting the Coachlight, an Ada bar Williamson frequently visited, was found raped and murdered. Williamson and friend Dennis Fritz were arrested five years later on flimsy testimony. In separate trials, both Fritz and then Williamson were found guilty in 1988. Williamson received a death sentence, while Fritz was sentenced to life without parole.

The evidence included expert testimony in hair analysis, which is now regarded as unreliable. The expert concluded that 13 of the 17 hairs found at the crime scene were "microscopically consistent" with those of Fritz and Williamson, and alleged that one of them was a "match." The defense failed to point out that although the hair samples could have implicated the pair, they equally could have cleared them both. Despite his rapidly failing mental health, no motion was made to assess Williamson's competence.

After their sentencing, a confession by a man named Ricky Jo Simmons came to light. Having learned of this while on death row, Williamson became increasingly convinced that Simmons had committed the murder and repeatedly demanded his arrest. Simmons was never charged. On September 22, 1994, Williamson was only five days away from being executed when the execution was stayed by the court following a habeas corpus petition. At the time, Williamson screamed "I'm innocent! I'm innocent! I'm innocent!" from his cell to protest his impending execution.

== Exoneration ==
After 11 years on death row, and following several appeals, Williamson and Fritz were cleared by DNA testing, and were finally freed on April 15, 1999 (Williamson was the 78th inmate exonerated from death row since 1973).. In 2003, they sued the City of Ada and agreed on a settlement of US$500 thousand (equivalent to $880 thousand in 2025); the State of Oklahoma also settled out of court for an undisclosed amount.

Many of the residents of Ada continued to believe that Williamson and Fritz were guilty long after they were exonerated. Indeed, both men reportedly felt it necessary to be very wary after their release, such was their belief that the prosecutor, Bill Peterson, and other officials of the Ada police would try to bring them to trial again.

== Death ==
Williamson died in a nursing home of cirrhosis five years later. Although he had a history of illicit drug and alcohol abuse, Thorazine and other potent psychotropic prescription drugs may have precipitated the cirrhosis. Best-selling novelist John Grisham read Williamson's obituary in The New York Times and made him and Fritz the subject of his first non-fiction book, The Innocent Man: Murder and Injustice in a Small Town, published in 2006. The book became a bestseller.

== Real killer ==
Glen Dale Gore (born 27 April 1960), an Ada man who had testified against both Williamson and Fritz, was ultimately convicted of the murder of Debbie Carter. He was the last person seen with Carter and also had been seen arguing with her on the night of her death. Although he was interviewed by the police, he was not fingerprinted, nor did he give saliva and hair samples. While Williamson and Fritz were incarcerated, Gore was also imprisoned on another unrelated violent crime conviction.

Once Williamson and Fritz had been cleared of murder, Gore eventually came to trial, based on the same DNA evidence that had cleared Fritz and Williamson. This evidence proved that it was Gore's DNA that was left at the scene. On June 24, 2003, Gore was convicted of first-degree murder and sentenced to death, but a state appeals court reversed his conviction in August 2005. He was once again convicted at his second trial on June 21, 2006, and sentenced to life without parole by Judge Tom Landrith, which was required by law due to a jury deadlock on sentencing.

On March 17, 2021, following the Supreme Court’s decision in McGirt v. Oklahoma, Gore’s 2nd conviction was vacated. On September 10, 2021, the Oklahoma Court of Criminal Appeals reinstated Gore’s conviction stating McGirt v. Oklahoma "is a new procedural rule" that "is not retroactive". On December 9, 2021, a writ of certiorari petition was filed to the Supreme Court of the United States on behalf of Gore, which was denied on February 22, 2022. Gore is currently serving his sentence at the Mack Alford Correctional Center.

== See also ==
- List of wrongful convictions in the United States
