= Barry Scheck =

American attorney and legal scholar (born 1949)

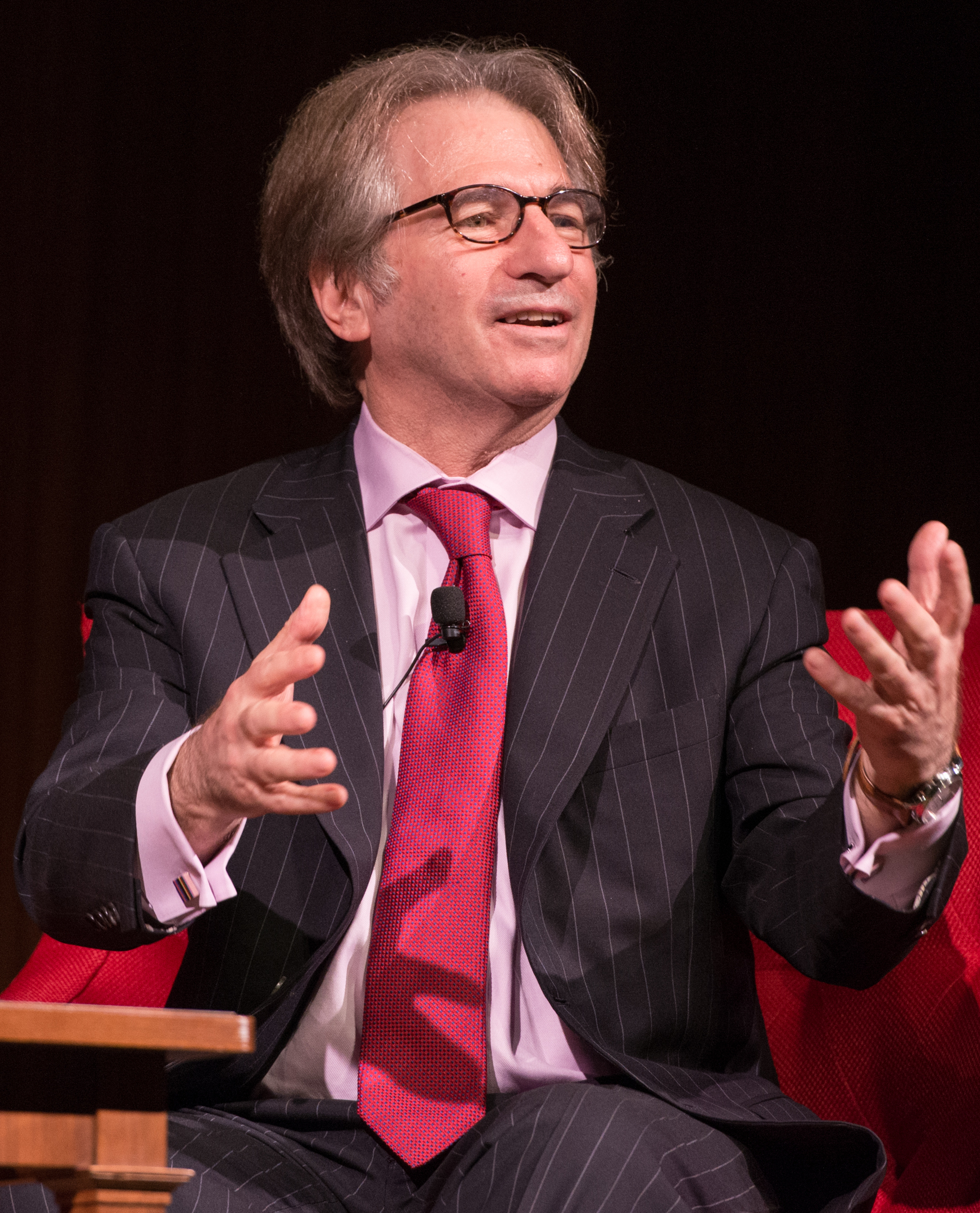
- Scheck at the LBJ Presidential Library, 2014
- Born: Barry Charles Scheck; September 19, 1949 (age 77); Queens, New York, U.S.
- Education: Yale University (BA); University of California, Berkeley (MCP, JD)
- Known for: Member of the O. J. Simpson defense team

Barry Charles Scheck (born September 19, 1949) is an American attorney and legal scholar. He received national media attention while serving on O. J. Simpson's defense team, collectively dubbed the "Dream Team", helping to win an acquittal in the highly publicized murder case. Scheck is the director of the Innocence Project and a professor at Yeshiva University's Benjamin N. Cardozo School of Law in New York City.

== Early life and education ==
Scheck was born in Queens, New York, in a Jewish family and grew up in the village of Flower Hill, New York, located near Port Washington. He graduated from the Horace Mann School in Riverdale, New York in 1967. He went on to receive a B.A. from Yale University in 1971 (majoring in Economics and American Studies) and a Master of City Planning (M.C.P.) and Juris Doctor (J.D.) from University of California, Berkeley, in 1974.

== Notable cases ==
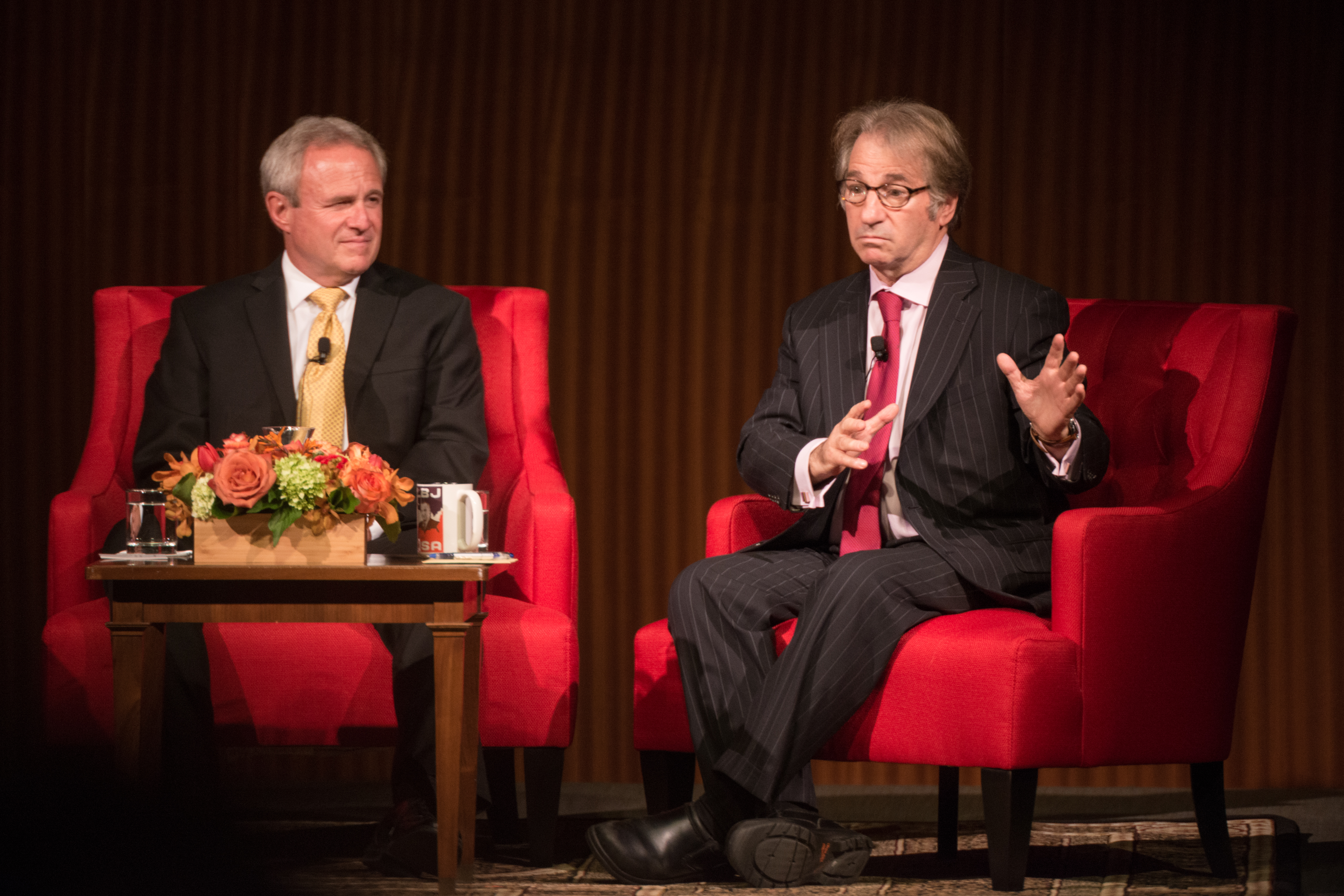
Scheck in 2014

Scheck was the personal lawyer for the Hedda Nussbaum case, in 1987. He both defended her and assisted in getting the charges against her dropped, while also assisting in ensuring Joel Steinberg's arrest and suing him in the civil case Nussbaum vs. Steinberg. Scheck was part of the team that defended O. J. Simpson in his 1995 trial. He was associated with the clearing in 1999 of Dennis Fritz and Ron Williamson who had spent 11 years in prison of wrongful murder convictions. He was lead lawyer who defended British au pair Louise Woodward in her 1997 murder trial.

More recently, he served as attorney of the wrongly accused Duke University lacrosse player Reade Seligmann to represent him in a civil lawsuit filed on October 5, 2007, against the city of Durham, North Carolina, and its former district attorney, Mike Nifong. He also was responsible for clearing John Restivo, Dennis Halstead, and John Kogut after 18 years in prison for the 1985 Lynbrook rape and murder of Theresa Fusco, when DNA evidence proved them innocent and implicated others.

=== O. J. Simpson murder case ===
Jurors Cooley, Bess, and Rubin-Jackson wrote in A Rush to Judgement? that Barry Scheck was the most persuasive attorney at the trial. However, Vincent Bugliosi, Darnel M. Hunt, Daniel M. Petrocelli, and defense witness Henry Lee all wrote that Scheck made many factually false claims about the physical evidence. Lee wrote in Blood Evidence: How DNA is Revolutionizing the Way We Solve Crimes (2003) that both of the defense's forensic DNA experts, Lee and Edward Blake, had rejected Scheck's argument that the mistakes made during evidence collection rendered the results unreliable and his contamination claim. Hunt wrote in O. J. Simpson Facts and Fictions: News Rituals in the Construction of Reality that Scheck "floated ridiculous conspiracy theories to the jury". Jeffrey Toobin wrote in The Run of His Life: The People v. O.J. Simpson that "Scheck's arguments presupposed a conspiracy so immense within the LAPD that, analyzed objectively, it seemed a practical impossibility."

Scheck argued that 100% of the DNA from the evidence samples was lost due to bacterial degradation because the swatches were collected and packaged in plastic bags, not paper bags as recommended, and then stored in a police van without being refrigerated for up to seven hours. The evidence samples were then cross-contaminated with DNA from Simpson, Nicole Brown, and Ron Goldman's reference vial being transferred to all but three evidence items. Scheck also argued the remaining three exhibits were planted by police and thus fraudulent. Lee wrote in Blood Evidence that most of the blood evidence was sent directly to the consulting labs and not the LAPD crime lab, where Scheck alleged the evidence was contaminated. Since all of the samples the consulting labs received were testable despite none of those samples having been "contaminated" in the LAPD crime lab, that conclusively disproves Scheck's claim that 100% of the DNA had been lost due to degradation because those samples should have been inconclusive. Lee writes that this also effectively refutes the contamination claim as well because if the evidence samples were not 100% degraded and were contaminated with Simpson's DNA in the LAPD crime lab, the result would be a mixture of Simpson's DNA and the real killer's DNA but the results only showed Simpson's DNA was present.

Lee wrote in Blood Evidence that Scheck's entire contamination claim was summarized by "high" DNA from the reference vials being accidentally transferred to the "low" DNA found in the extraction product, that was then amplified producing erroneous results. He made three arguments for how this allegedly happened, none of which had any merit: contamination from the reagents used for amplification; cross-contamination from the reference vials to the dna extraction product and contamination from PCR carryover amplification. In the first case, Scheck claimed that contamination could have happened if the reagents used for Amplification were contaminated from repeated use with the reference blood but his witness admitted that all of the reagents used had tested negative for contamination. In the second case, Scheck alleged that the victims blood in Simpson's Bronco could be the result of cross-contamination from the reference vials ("High" DNA) to the evidence samples ("Low" DNA) if they were extracted first but again Scheck's witness conceded that the evidence samples were actually extracted first before the reference samples, eliminating that possibility. Scheck's witness also admitted that because two separate DNA labs collected blood from the same spot in the Bronco independently and both returned the same matches, that proves they weren't contaminates. The last argument for contamination — from PCR carryover application — happened allegedly when Yamauchi took the PCR extraction product ("Low DNA") to the PCR amplification room which was in "the same location" as the evidence locker ("High" DNA) which would be a high risk for contamination. However, Scheck's witness "conceded the PCR extraction product was not returned to the specific area near the extraction room or evidence-handling area but was taken to a completely separate area located a comfortable distance away making a contamination scenario highly improbable". M. L. Rantala wrote in OJ Unmasked that Scheck implied the evidence locker was in the PCR amplification room so his contamination claim would be plausible but opined that he was being deceptive because he had toured the lab and knew that wasn't true.

Petrocelli also noted in Triumph of Justice that Scheck's witness John Gerdes lied when he said that Collin Yamauchi admitted spilling Simpson's blood in the lab presumably so the defense could imply that contamination could have happened that way as well.

Vincent Bugliosi wrote in Outrage that Scheck's contamination claim was the most "ridiculous argument of the trial". For starters Buligiosi notes that Scheck contradicted himself when he claimed it was impossible to distinguish blood from the reference vials from blood from the body despite demonstrating just that the week prior using EDTA.

Scheck also claimed that all of this alleged contamination occurred through random carelessness in the lab yet the affected evidence items were clearly not random: the only three valid matches were coincidentally the same three the defense claimed were planted while the remaining 58 matches were all coincidentally false positives despite that never having happened before. The substrate controls that are used to determine if contamination like he was suggesting occurred were also coincidentally all false negatives so Scheck was claiming that the contamination only got on the evidence items despite they and the substrate controls all being handled interchangeably at the same time. Clinical molecular geneticist Dr. Brad Popovich called Schecks claims "ridiculous". Lee published "A Systematic Analysis of PCR Contamination" which concluded that "no significant contamination occurs from random carelessness in the lab".

In Triumph of Justice: Closing the Book on the O. J. Simpson Saga, Petrocelli explains how he disproved all of Scheck's blood planting claims. Scheck implied that Vannatter could have planted Simpson's blood at the crime scene when he returned later that evening to Simpson's home to deliver his blood reference vial to Dennis Fung but the crime scene is actually at Nicole Brown's home. Scheck then suggested that another police officer could have "sprinkled Simpson's blood at the crime scene" but the prosecution demonstrated that the blood was photographed being there prior to Simpsons blood being drawn by the nurse. Scheck then implied that Vannatter could have planted the victims blood in the Bronco when he returned to Simpson's home but the Bronco had been impounded prior to his arrival and wasn't even there. Scheck then claimed that the results from the second Bronco collection were unreliable because the car had been burglarized (not true) but the DNA matches are the same before and afterwards, disproving that claim. Scheck then produced two witnesses who claimed there was no blood in the impounded Bronco implying it was planted afterwards but the prosecution produced photographs of the blood in the impounded Bronco, disproving that claim. Scheck also claimed that some of Simpson's blood from his reference vial was missing but the nurse who drew it testified that no blood was actually missing. Scheck also argued that the identification of EDTA in two evidence samples is proof they were planted but his own witness testified that he did not identify EDTA and that his results actually prove those blood stains did not come from the reference vials. Christopher Darden wrote in In Contempt that nearly all of Scheck's blood planting claims were originally made by Stephen Singular in his book proposal for Legacy of Deception: An Investigation of Mark Fuhrman and Racism in the L.A.P.D. The key difference is that he claimed that Fuhrman, not Vannatter, planted all of the blood evidence. Singular cited an unnamed source in the LAPD but both Johnnie Cochran and Carl Douglas dismissed Singulars claims because Fuhrman never had access to Simpson's reference vial. The New York Times wrote that "Mr. Simpson's "dream team" has fostered public mistrust of defense lawyers in general because of their 'shotgun approach' of attempting to shoot down every scrap of evidence against Mr. Simpson with a barrage of alternative (i.e., conspiracy) explanations" and in 2014, Scheck acknowledged that public perception of defense attorneys changed as a result of the trial.

Scheck was quoted as saying "he totally and absolutely believed in the innocence of O. J.Simpson" and he was primarily credited with Simpson's acquittal. However, one year later at the civil trial, all of his blood planting and contamination claims were disproven. Petrocelli wrote in Triumph of Justice that "Scheck prostituted his skills to get Simpson off with murder" and that he disproved all of his blood planting claims using photos and video that were available at the criminal trial. Lee wrote in Blood evidence that Scheck was a nationally known skeptic of Forensic DNA matching at the time and none of his arguments against the validity of the DNA evidence in this case had any merit because of the safeguards in place which Scheck simply ignored. Buligiosi wrote in Outrage that the jury trusted Scheck and quoted his claims verbatim in Madam Foreman as justification for their verdict but when those claims were disproven, the jurors received harsh criticism while Scheck enjoyed a Teflon status from the media and faced almost no criticism despite making those claims himself. Darnell Hunt wrote in O. J. Simpson Facts and Fictions that nearly all of the factually false claims that are popularly believed about the trial were made or implied by Scheck including: that Vannatter returned to the Bundy crime scene with Simpson's reference vial, that Fuhrman ever had custody of any of the reference vials, that Yamauchi spilled Simpson's blood in the DNA lab, that some of Simpsons blood from his reference vial was missing, that EDTA was actually found in any of the blood evidence, that any of the blood evidence was actually contaminated in the lab, that any of the blood was planted by the police or any credible evidence of fraud was produced by the defense.

== Innocence Project ==
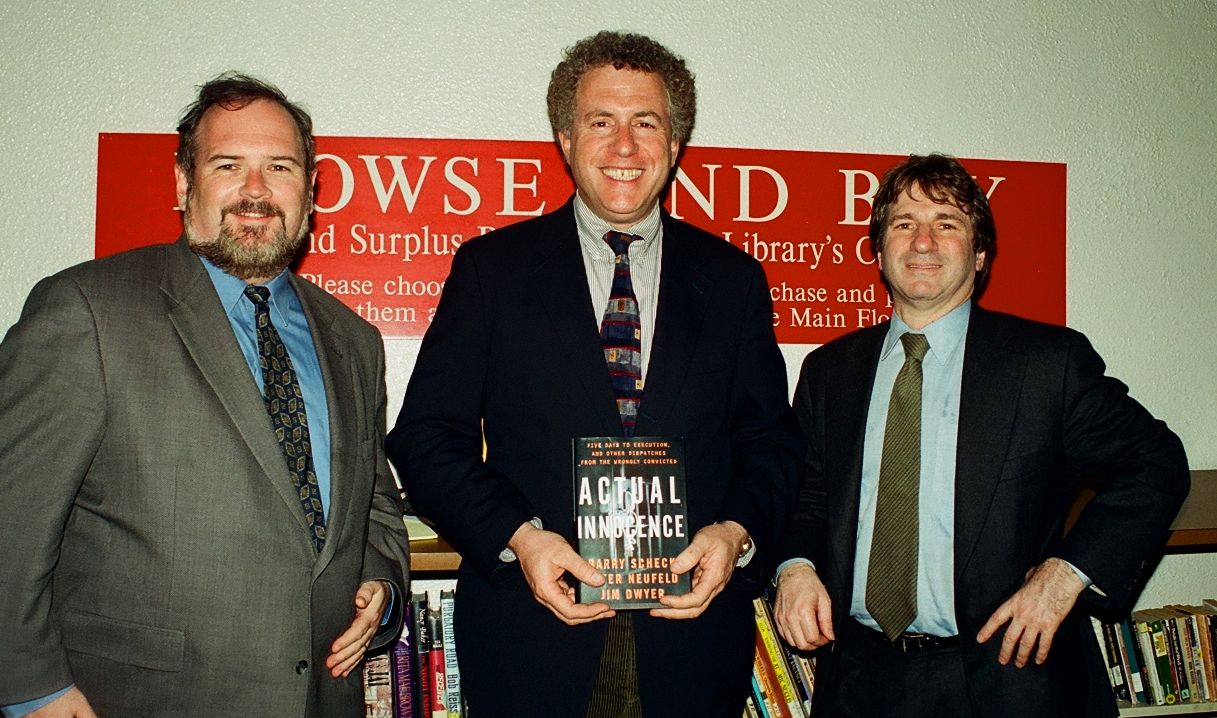
Scheck (right) presenting Actual Innocence with co-authors Peter Neufeld and Jim Dwyer, 2001

Scheck co-founded the Innocence Project in 1992 with Peter Neufeld, also his co-counsel on the O. J. Simpson defense team. The Project is dedicated to the utilization of DNA evidence as a means to exculpate individuals of crimes for which they were wrongfully convicted. To date, 375 wrongful convictions have been overturned by DNA testing thanks to the Project and other legal organizations. The Innocence Project does not use legal technicalities to challenge convictions; the Project accepts only cases in which newly discovered scientific evidence can potentially prove that a convicted person is factually not guilty.

Scheck is a professor at the Benjamin N. Cardozo School of Law, where he established the first Innocence Project. He is Director of Clinical Education for the Trial Advocacy Program and the Center for the Study of Law and Ethics, and a former staff attorney at the Legal Aid Society of New York. From 2004–2005 he served as president of the National Association of Criminal Defense Lawyers. In 1996 he received the Robert C. Heeney Award, the "NACDL's most prestigious award ... given annually to the one criminal defense attorney who best exemplifies the goals and values of the Association, and the legal profession"

== Recognition ==
In 1996, he received the Robert C. Heeney Award.

In 2008, he received the Golden Plate Award of the American Academy of Achievement.

In 2013, he received the New York State Bar Association's Gold Medal.

== Selected bibliography ==
- Scheck, Barry, Peter Neufeld, and Jim Dwyer. Actual Innocence. New York: Doubleday, 2000; ISBN 038549341X.
- Scheck, Barry, Peter Neufeld, and Taryn Simon. The Innocents. New York: Umbrage Editions in association with The Innocence Project, 2003; ISBN 1884167187.

== See also ==
- Scheck was played by Rob Morrow in the award-winning FX series The People v. O. J. Simpson: American Crime Story.
- Scheck was played by Peter Gallagher in Conviction, a film based on a true story, where he helps to vacate Kenneth Waters's conviction.
- Scheck appeared as himself in Season 2, Episode 9, of the CBS drama series The Good Wife in a plot involving the Innocence Project. He also appeared in Season 5, Episode 1 in an Eighth Amendment violation case.
- Scheck will be played by John Magaro in the upcoming HBO miniseries The Trial of Louise Woodward.
