= Peter Neufeld =

American attorney (born 1950)

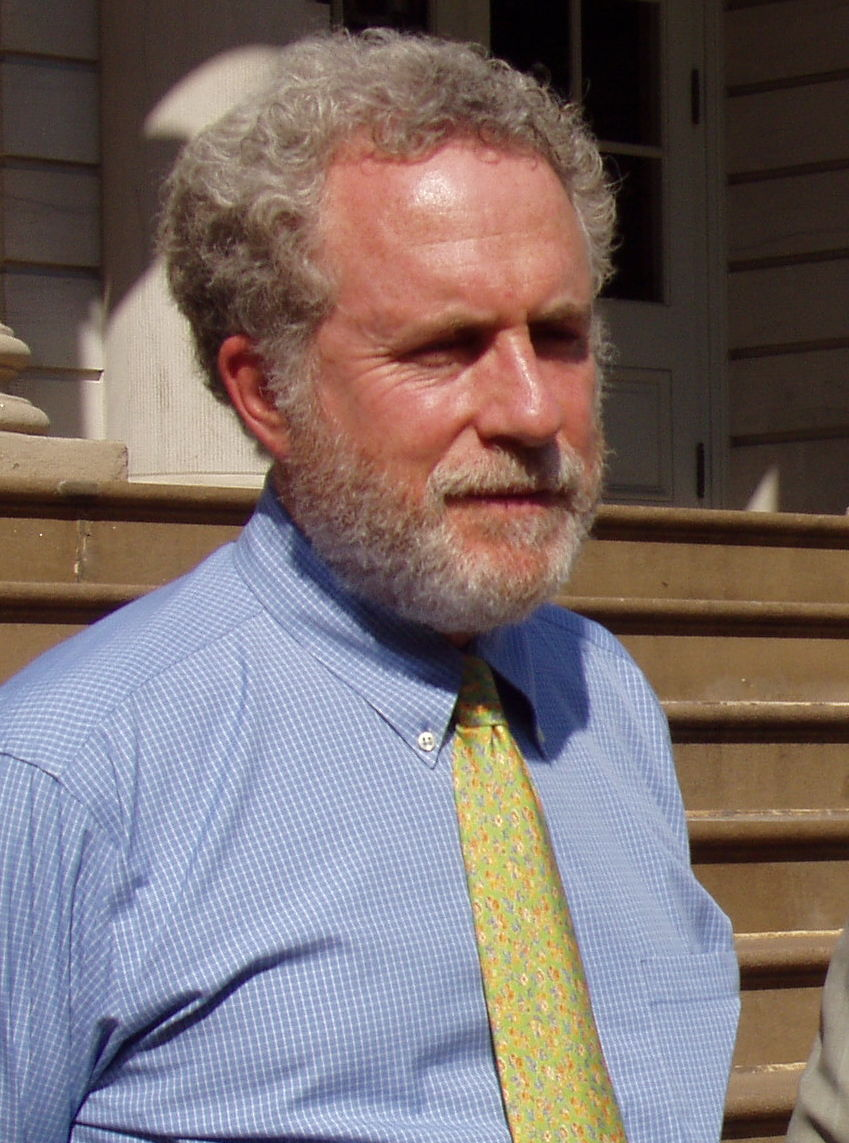
- Neufeld in 2009
- Born: July 17, 1950 (age 76); New York City, New York, U.S.
- Education: University of Wisconsin, Madison (BA); New York University (JD)
- Known for: Defense attorney on the O. J. Simpson murder case

Peter J. Neufeld (born July 17, 1950) is an American attorney. He is best known as the co-founder, with Barry Scheck, of the Innocence Project, and for his role on the defense team of O. J. Simpson in his murder trial.

== Early life and education ==
Neufeld was born in Brooklyn, New York City, on July 17, 1950, and grew up in West Hempstead on Long Island. He is Jewish. As a teenager, he was active in both civil rights and antiwar movements and spent time in southeastern Kentucky as a member of the Encampment for Citizenship. In 1972, he graduated from the University of Wisconsin–Madison with a B.A. in history. In 1975, he earned a J.D. from the New York University School of Law.

== Career ==
=== Early cases defended and litigated ===
From 1976 to 1985, Neufeld worked as a staff attorney at the Legal Aid Society in the Bronx, New York City. It was during these years his focus on the intersection of law and science emerged. Some of the people defended while at Legal Aid include:

- Vicente "Panama" Alba, 1978 (People v. Vicente Alba), a leader of the Puerto Rican civil rights group The Young Lords
- William Hicks, 1979 (People v. William Hicks), in a case involving ballistics evidence
- James Gray, 1981 (James Derrick Gray v. Tekben), in a case involving judicial first impressions on the limits of the defense of diminished capacity and the rights of a person who had been found not guilty by reason of insanity to procure a de novo jury trial on whether he is a current danger to himself or others
- Marvin Davis, 1985 (People v. Marvin Davis), in a case involving the court's exclusion of novel serological evidence proffered by the prosecution

=== Cases defended and litigated in private practice ===
After leaving the Legal Aid Society, one of Neufeld's first cases was his defense, in 1988, of Damian Pizarro, a battered woman who killed her abuser in self-defense. This case was the first successful use of battered woman syndrome to secure an acquittal in New York County. The case was filmed and released as a documentary on British television where it helped leverage the creation of safe houses for women victimized by domestic violence.

In 1989, in People v. Castro, Peter Neufeld and Barry Scheck won an unprecedented pretrial hearing, precluding the use of inculpatory DNA evidence that at the time had not been validated for use in criminal prosecutions. The court's ruling and attendant experts' consensus report led to the National Academy of Sciences establishing a panel to develop scientific standards for forensic DNA analysis.

In 1991, in People v. McNulty, et al., Neufeld, with his wife Adele Bernhard, defended several Irish immigrants who had been beaten, falsely arrested and charged by the police in Yonkers, New York. After winning their acquittal, Neufeld successfully sued the police officers responsible for the beatings.

In 1995, Neufeld served on the defense team for O.J. Simpson's murder trial.

In 1996, Peter Neufeld, Barry Scheck and Johnnie Cochran established the law partnership Cochran Neufeld & Scheck, with a focus on representing plaintiffs victimized by the excessive force of state actors, those who were wrongfully convicted, and others who claimed their civil rights were violated by the police or the government. After Mr. Cochran's death, in 2009 the firm changed its name to Neufeld Scheck & Brustin. The litigation of the firm frequently results in systemic reforms accompanying any monetary compensation for plaintiffs. Some of the people Neufeld represented in private practice, either alone or as a member of a team include:

- Abner Louima (The City of New York v. Abner Louima, 1997), a Haitian immigrant who had been tortured by members of the New York Police Department. The successful civil suit brought compensation to Mr. Louima and institutional reforms within the NYPD and the Police Benevolent Association.
- The family of Thomas Pizzuto (Pizzuto vs. Nassau County, 1999), who was beaten to death by Nassau County, New York, jail guards. The civil suit along with the federal prosecution of the guards resulted in changes in the department's procedures.
- Earl Washington Jr., an intellectually impaired man wrongly convicted for rape and murder in 1983, had been sentenced to death, coming within 9 days of being executed. In 2006, Neufeld's firm won the lawsuit against the estate of a Virginia State Police investigator who fabricated the confession in the underlying case. The civil suit precipitated a state audit of hundreds of criminal cases in Virginia and also led to changes in Virginia law concerning the handling of post-conviction claims of innocence.
- In 2015, Peter Neufeld and his team won a civil suit for client Donald Gates, an innocent man framed by Washington, D.C., homicide detectives. This case, along with several other exonerations secured by the Public Defender Service for the District of Columbia brought into focus the systemic misapplication of forensic science by the F.B.I.

=== Formation of the Innocence Project ===
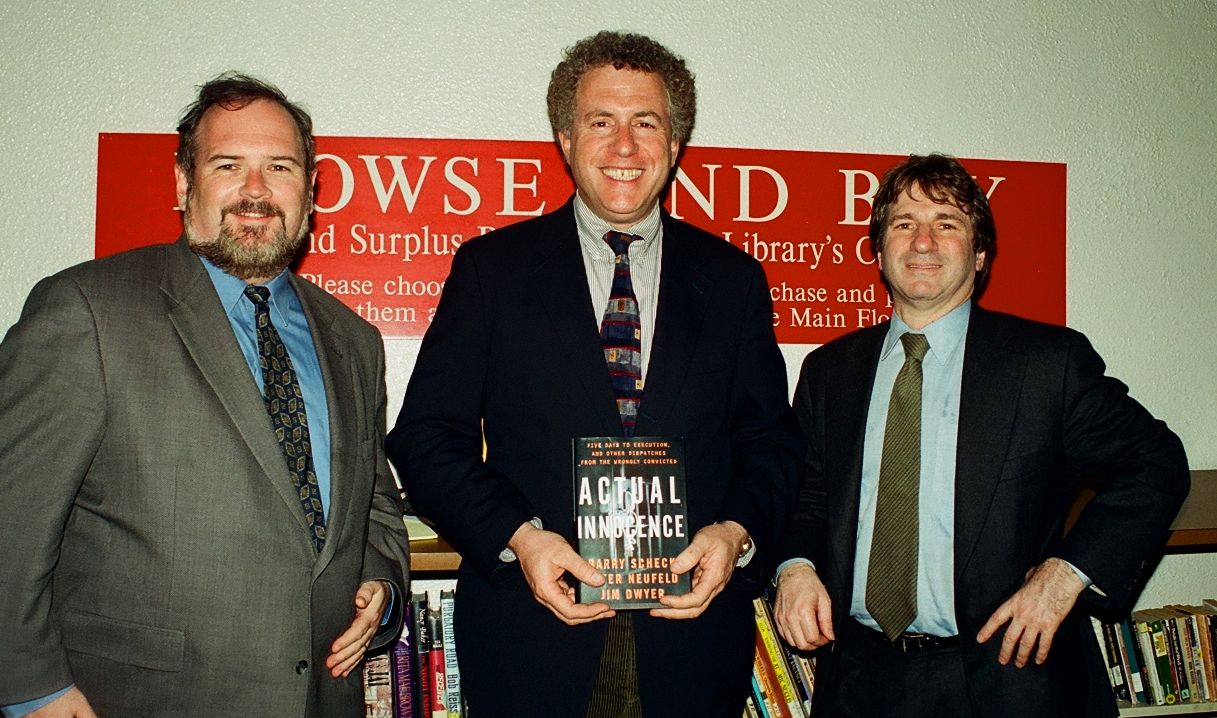
Neufeld (center) presenting Actual Innocence with co-authors Barry Scheck and Jim Dwyer, 2001

In 1992, Peter Neufeld and Barry Scheck founded the Innocence Project to assist convicted prisoners who could be proven innocent post-conviction through DNA testing. To date, 343 people in the United States have been exonerated by DNA testing, including 20 who served time on death row. These people served an average of 14 years in prison before exoneration and release. The Innocence Project's full-time staff attorneys and Cardozo Law School clinic students provide direct representation or critical assistance in most of these cases. The Innocence Project states on its website that groundbreaking use of DNA technology to free innocent people has provided irrefutable proof that wrongful convictions are not isolated or rare events but instead arise from systemic defects. Now an independent nonprofit organization affiliated with Cardozo Law School, the Innocence Project's mission is to free innocent people who remain incarcerated and to bring substantive reform to the criminal justice system responsible for their unjust imprisonment. They get thousands of letters from wrongly convicted inmates every year.

=== Teaching and speaking ===
Neufeld taught trial advocacy at Fordham School of Law from 1988–1991. Currently he teaches Cardozo law students within the Innocence Project clinic. Neufeld has lectured throughout the world on the causes of wrongful convictions and appropriate remedies and specifically on the fundamental lack of scientific rigor in much of forensic science.

In 1995, he was appointed to serve on the New York State Commission on Forensic Science by then-Governor George Pataki.

In 2014, he was appointed by the U.S. Department of Justice to the National Commission on Forensic Science. As of 2016, Neufeld continues to serve on both commissions. He also chaired the Medical Committee of the Board of Trustees for the Montefiore Medical Center from 1995 to 2015.

== Selected publications ==
- R.A. Leo, P.J. Neufeld, S.A. Drizin, & A.E. Taslitz, "Promoting Accuracy in the Use of Confession Evidence: An Argument for Pre-Trial Reliability Assessments to Prevent Wrongful Convictions," Temple Law Review (2013).
- S.A. Crowley & Neufeld, (2013). Increasing the Accuracy of Criminal Justice Decision-Making. In Philip H. Crowley & Thomas R. Zentall (Eds.), Comparative Decision Making. USA: Oxford University Press.
- B.L. Garrett & Neufeld, "Invalid Forensic Science Testimony and Wrongful Convictions," Virginia Law Review, Vol. 95, No. 1, March 2009.
- Leo, Drizin, Neufeld, B.R. Hall & A. Vatner, "Bringing Reliability Back In: False Confessions and Legal Safeguards in the Twenty-First Century," Wisconsin Law Review, Vol. 2006, No. 2.
- Neufeld, "The Near Irrelevance of Daubert to Criminal Justice and Some Suggestions for Reform," American Journal of Public Health, Vol. 95, No. S1, 2005.
- B.C. Scheck & Neufeld, "Toward the Formation of 'Innocence Commissions' in America," Judicature, Vol. 86, No. 2, 2002.
- Neufeld, "Preventing the Execution of the Innocent," Hofstra Law Review, Vol. 29, No. 4, 2001.
- ——, "Legal and Ethical Implications of Post-Conviction DNA Exonerations," New England Law Review, Vol. 35, No. 1, 2001.
- Neufeld & Scheck, "DNA and Innocence Scholarship," in Wrongly Convicted: Perspectives on Failed Justice, Rutgers University Press, Saundra Westervelt and John Humphrey, Eds., 2001.
- Scheck, Neufeld & J. Dwyer, Actual Innocence: Five Days to Execution, And Other Dispatches From the Wrongly Convicted, Doubleday, February 2000.
- Neufeld & Scheck, Foreword to "DNA Exculpatory Cases Study Report," National Institute of Justice, 1996.
- Neufeld, "Have You No Sense of Decency?" The Journal of Criminal Law and Criminology, Vol. 84, No. 1, Spring 1993.
- Neufeld & N. Colman, "When Science Takes the Witness Stand," Scientific American, May 1990, Vol. 262, No. 5.
- Neufeld & Scheck, "Factors Affecting the Fallibility of DNA Profiling: Is There Less Than Meets the Eye?" Expert Evidence Reporter, December 1989, Vol. 1, No. 4.
- Neufeld, "Admissibility of New or Novel Scientific Evidence in Criminal Cases," DNA Technology and Forensic Science, 32 Banbury Report, 1989.
