= List of exonerated death row inmates =

This list contains names of people who were found guilty of capital crimes and placed on death row but later had their convictions overturned. Many of these exonerees' sentences were overturned by acquittal or pardon, but some of those listed were exonerated posthumously. The state listed is that in which the conviction occurred, the year is that of release and the case is that which overturned the conviction.

This list includes:

1. Former death row inmates who were conditionally pardoned, had their sentences commuted, or had their cases dismissed, and were subsequently exonerated.
2. Death row inmates who were legally exonerated, but not proven factually innocent.
3. Death row inmates who remain in prison or on death row for other capital or non-capital convictions.

This list does not include:

1. People who were convicted of other related offenses or lesser related offenses.
2. People who were initially exonerated, but subsequently convicted for the same offense. For example, Timothy Hennis was later retried and convicted of the Eastburn family murders under dual sovereignty after new evidence proved his guilt.

The names of exonerees who names are marked with an asterisk (*) indicate that the events of their cases in which it was determined that no crime had taken place.

Events of case in which it was determined that no crime had taken place

== Canada ==
Year	Details of Exoneration
1913	Stephen Kiyoshk was accused of murdering two men, Charles Nahdee and Adam Johns, in 1912. He was convicted of murdering Johns, but not Nahdee, despite the belief that both victims had been murdered by the same person. One of the main witnesses, Flossie Williams, also claimed that Kiyoshk, was innocent, but she had an incentive to lie since she was Kiyoshk's girlfriend and later married him. Kiyoshk was awarded a new trial and the charges were later withdrawn. In 1939, Kiyoshk was charged with murdering another man named Jerry Blackbird. He was convicted of murder in 1940 and sentenced to death. This time, Kiyoshk's appeals were unsuccessful. He was hanged in 1941.
1923	Terlochen Singh was convicted of the murder of 15-year-old Hukam Singh in 1922. Terlochen was reprieved after officials received an affidavit declaring that new evidence had been uncovered. He was acquitted at a retrial after a witness testified that she had seen a beardless Indian man in company with the victim prior to his murder (Terlochen had a beard).
1928	Joseph Sankey was convicted of the murder of Loretta Chisholm in 1926. In 1927, Sankey was granted a new trial after it was determined that he had been coerced into making incriminating statements to the police. He was acquitted at a retrial the following year.
1928	Leung Chong was convicted of the murder of RCMP officer Ernest Sargent in 1927. Chong was granted a retrial over the use of inadmissible character evidence against him. He was acquitted the following year.
1938	John Comba was convicted of the rape and murder of 13-year-old Ethel Hedderwick in 1937 based on a coincidental remark he made shortly before finding the body, "I think we shall find something near here," and the fact that he washed his clothes shortly after. In May 1938, the Court of Appeal for Ontario overturned Comba's conviction, stating that he had an alibi. The Supreme Court of Canada barred a retrial for Comba the following month.
1943	In 1943, Luigi Stabile was charged with the murder of his brother-in-law, who disappeared in 1916, after his skeleton was discovered underneath the cellar of the farmhouse where Stabile once lived. This drew suspicion since Stabile had never notified the police about the disappearance and the victim's daughter later testified that she saw her father enter the farmhouse with Stabile shortly before his disappearance. Noting that no motive or cause of death was ever established, an appellate court found that there was insufficient evidence against Stabile.
1944	Harold Ferguson was convicted of the murder of Abraham Rosenberg in 1944. The Court of Appeal for Ontario overturned his conviction, finding that he had not received a fair trial. No retrial was ordered.
1946	Lorne Cecil Harris was convicted of the rape and murder of Audrey Lyons in 1946. It was quickly determined that money and rings had also been stolen from the victim. However, none of these items were found on Harris, who was acquitted at a retrial. At the second trial, the jury was told that Harris, who was drunk, would have been unable to subdue the victim on his own.
1947	Evelyn Dick was convicted of the murder of her husband in 1947. She was granted a new trial after statements she made to the police were deemed inadmissible and acquitted at her retrial. Later that year, however, Dick was convicted of manslaughter for killing her infant son and sentenced to life in prison. She was paroled in 1958.
1955	Olivier Tarte was convicted of the murder of his 94-year-old aunt in 1954. His conviction was overturned after an appellate court found that his confession had been obtained under coercion and there was no other evidence proving his guilt.
1961	Charles Heathman was convicted of the sexual assault and murder of a 10-year-old boy in 1961. His conviction was overturned after three out of five judges for the British Columbia Court of Appeal said the evidence indicated that someone else had killed the boy. In 1962, Heathman made a written confession to the murder, but could not be retried due to the double jeopardy rule. Heathman was committed to a psychiatric hospital after his confession, which he then attempted to recant. Heathman was released in 1964. Later that year, he was sentenced to two years in prison for the possession of narcotics.
2007	Steven Truscott, then 14, was convicted of a schoolmate's rape and murder in 1959. His sentence was commuted to life in prison four months later, and he was paroled in 1969. His conviction was overturned in 2007 for "miscarriage of justice." A court found that while it could not declare Truscott factually innocent, there was insufficient evidence to declare him guilty beyond a reasonable doubt. In July 2008, the Ontario government announced it would pay Truscott $6.5 million in compensation for his ordeal.

== India ==
Six men (Ankush Maruti Shinde, Rajya Appa Shinde, Ambadas Laxman Shinde, Raju Mhasu Shinde, Bapu Appa Shinde and Suresh Shinde) were convicted and sentenced to death in 2009 on charges of rape and murder. On 6 March 2019, the Supreme Court of India acquitted all six death-row convicts and proclaimed them innocent.

== Ireland ==
In 2015, the President of Ireland granted a posthumous pardon to Harry Gleeson, who was executed in 1941 for the murder of Moll McCarthy, on the grounds that he had been wrongfully convicted.

In 2018, the President of Ireland granted a posthumous pardon to Maolra Seoighe, who was executed in 1882 for the Maamtrasna Murders on the grounds that he had most likely been wrongfully convicted. In addition, he had not received a fair trial. Although Seoighe could only speak Irish, the case was heard in English without any translation service.

== Israel ==
Year	Details of Exoneration
1949	In 1948, IDF major Meir Tobianski was tried by a drumhead court-martial for treason after being accused of spying for Jordan during the 1948 Arab–Israeli War. On June 30, 1948, he was found guilty of passing information on targets for Jordanian artillery and sentenced to death. Tobianski was not allowed to appeal the verdict and was executed by firing squad minutes after sentencing on the orders of Isser Be'eri, the first director of the IDF's intelligence branch. On July 1, 1949, Tobianski was posthumously acquitted and had his rank reinstated by Prime Minister David Ben-Gurion. In November 1949, Isser Be'eri, who was forced to resign was tried and found guilty of manslaughter by the Tel Aviv District Court for his role in Tobianski's wrongful execution. The court found that since there was a ceasefire in effect at the time, any information allegedly passed by Tobianski could not have helped Jordanian artillery. Be'eri received a symbolic punishment of one day of prison, "from sunrise to sunset, 30 days after sentencing", before being pardoned by the president, Chaim Weizmann.
1993	In 1988, John Demjanjuk was sentenced to death war crimes, crimes against humanity, crimes against the Jewish people after being convicted of his alleged participation in atrocities at Treblinka extermination camp. Multiple survivors of the camp had identified Demjanjuk as a notorious guard known as Ivan the Terrible. In 1993, the Supreme Court of Israel overturned the verdict against Demjanjuk after Soviet archives proved that he had never been at the camp. The written statements of 37 former guards at Treblinka identified Ivan the Terrible was a man named "Ivan Marchenko". Nevertheless, the documents simultaneously proved that while Demjanjuk was never at Treblinka, he had served at other concentration camps, including Sobibor extermination camp. The prosecution sought to retry him for lesser war crimes, but the court refused, declaring that it'd be a violation of double jeopardy and that, "We know nothing about him at Sobibor." After his acquittal, Demjanjuk, who had been living in Ohio prior to his prosecution, was allowed to return to the United States after having his citizenship restored. However, in 1999, U.S. prosecutors again sought to deport Demjanjuk for serving as a guard at other concentration camp. His citizenship was revoked in 2002 and he was deported to Germany in 2009. In 2011, Demjanjuk was convicted of being an accessory to the murders of 28,060 Jews at Sobibor and sentenced to five years in prison, with credit for the two years he had already served in pre-trial detention. The judge released Demjanjuk from custody pending his appeal. He died before a decision could be made on his appeal in 2012.

== Japan ==
Year	Details of Exoneration
1983	Sakae Menda was forced to confess to the murders of a Buddhist priest and his wife in 1948 and was convicted on two counts of murder and robbery in 1949. In a 1983 retrial, he was found not guilty of all charges. He died in 2020.
1989	Masao Akahori was convicted in 1954 at the age of 24 of raping and murdering a schoolgirl. In 1989, he became the fourth death row inmate in Japan to be released.
2024	Iwao Hakamada was accused of stabbing a family of four to death and covering it up with a house fire in 1966. Hakamada was released from prison in 2014 and was acquitted in a retrial by the Shizuoka District Court.

== Singapore ==
Year	Details of Exoneration
1997	Nadasan Chandra Secharan was charged with the 1995 killing of Ramapiram Kannickaisparry, his former lover, and the prosecution alleged that Nadasan stabbed Ramapiram with a knife inside his van before he drove it and knocked over Ramapiram, killing her after she tried to end their affair. Nadasan was sentenced to death in 1996, but in 1997, the Singaporean Court of Appeal acquitted Nadasan after they found the evidence weak against him and accepted that he was repairing his van at another location during lunchtime at the time of the murder.
2011	Ismil Kadar and his brother Muhammad were both charged with the 2005 murder of Tham Weng Kuen, their 69-year-old neighbour. Originally, Ismil was implicated because Muhammad claimed in his confession that Ismil stabbed Tham to death while he was carrying out the robbery, but he ultimately changed his story and stated he was alone responsible for the murder. Furthermore, there was no physical evidence to prove that Ismil was there at the scene of crime, and Tham's bedridden husband who overheard the commotion and murder, testified that there was only one "male Malay" intruder (in Loh's words) who came in to rob and kill his wife. Nevertheless, the brothers were both found guilty and sentenced to death, but Ismil's conviction and sentence were overturned upon his appeal in 2011, after the Singaporean Court of Appeal acquitted him and found no evidence linking Ismil to the murder. Muhammad's conviction was upheld and he was hanged for the murder in 2015.

== Taiwan ==
Year	Details of Exoneration
2012	Su Chien-ho (蘇建和), Liu Bing-lang (劉秉郎) and Chuang Lin-hsun (莊林勳) were sentenced to death for the 1991 murder of Wu Ming-han and his wife Yeh Ying-lan in Xizhi District, Taipei County, Taiwan. They were acquitted in 2012.
2016	Cheng Hsing-tse (鄭性澤) was sentenced to death for the 2002 murder of a police officer in Fengyuan, Taichung, Taiwan. He was acquitted in May 2016.

== United Kingdom ==
Year	Details of Exoneration
1966	Timothy Evans, convicted of the murder of his infant daughter Geraldine in 1950, was hanged on March 9, 1950, and posthumously pardoned in 1966.
1998	Mahmood Hussein Mattan was found guilty of slashing a shop owners throat at the Cardiff Docks in 1952. He convicted and hanged in 1952 but his conviction was quashed in 1998.
1998	Derek Bentley was hanged for the murder of a policeman during an attempted burglary. He was convicted in 1952, executed in 1953, later pardoned in 1993, and the conviction quashed in 1998.
2003	George Kelly, who was executed in 1950 for the Cameo Cinema murder case, had his conviction quashed in 2003.

== United States ==
As of December 5, 2025, the Innocence Database maintained by the Death Penalty Information Center shows 201 exonerations of prisoners who had been sentenced to death in the United States since 1973.

=== 1820s ===
Year	State	Details of Exoneration
1820	Vermont	Brothers Jesse and Stephen Boorn were convicted in 1819 for the disappearance and murder of their brother-in-law. Stephen Boorn's sentence was commuted to life imprisonment by the Vermont legislature. They were both pardoned in 1820 when the brother-in-law was found alive, working on a farm in New Jersey.

=== 1850s ===
Year	State	Details of Exoneration
1851	California	Thomas Berdue was misidentified as a man who murdered the local sheriff and robbed a store owner in California. The real murderer was found to be James Stuart, who bore a striking resemblance to Berdue. Stuart was lynched by a vigilance committee after confessing to the murder.

=== 1880s ===
Year	State	Details of Exoneration
1889	Arkansas	William Woods was convicted in 1888 for the shooting murder of a hiker he and his friend, Henry Miller, had met at Commodore Hollow on the Cherokee Nation reserve. After multiple pleas of innocence, it eventually caught the attention of President Harrison's Attorney General H. H. Miller who demanded a more thorough investigation. The secondary investigation brought to light that hiker the two met was actually alive for several weeks after the supposed murder took place and that the witnesses from the original trial were wrong. Upon Miller's request, President Harrison pardoned Woods in 1889. However, Henry Miller had his sentence commuted to life in prison for unknown reasons.

=== 1890s ===
Year	State	Details of Exoneration
1895	Pennsylvania	Michael Sabol was convicted in 1891 for the beating death of an Irish man during a riot. The riot started when 200 Hungarian workers on strike stormed a factory where Irish strikebreakers were working, leading to the death of 16 men. Sabol was convicted on the sole, problematic testimony of a man of Irish descent. He was exonerated in 1895 when a man who bore a close resemblance to George Rusnak, another man convicted for the same murder, was identified as one of the real murderers. Sabol died of consumption two weeks later.
1897	Pennsylvania	George Rusnak was convicted in 1891 for the beating death of an Irish man during a riot. The riot started when 200 Hungarian workers on strike stormed a factory where Irish strikebreakers were working, leading to the death of 16 men. Rusnak was convicted on the sole, problematic testimony of a man of Irish descent. His sentence was commuted to life in prison and he was pardoned in 1897 when a man who bore a close resemblance to Rusnak was identified as one of the real murderers.
1898	Mississippi	Will Purvis was convicted in 1893 of the murder of Will Buckley. Buckley had submitted evidence to a Grand Jury that his black farmhand had been beaten by a group of fellow Whitecaps. While on his way to the home of Purvis, he was shot and killed. Bloodhounds led the police to 19-year-old Purvis, another White Cap. All witnesses for his defense was thrown out leading to his conviction on the testimony of Buckley brother and their affiliation to the Whitecaps. During his execution he proclaimed his innocence and asked whoever did commit the crime to step forward, but nobody did. When he was hanged, the noose slipped. When the sheriff attempted to hang him again, the crowd of onlookers protested. He then escaped with the help of supporters and hid in the woods till he surrendered. The new governor then commuted his sentence to life in prison. Two years later, Buckley's brother recanted his testimony that convicted Purvis leading to a full pardon from the governor in 1889. One of the two real murderers, Joseph Beard, confessed on his deathbed.

=== 1900s ===
Year	State	Details of Exoneration
1901	Illinois	Michael J. Synon was convicted in 1900 for the bludgeoning death of his wife. Despite over 20 witnesses that he was at a local saloon at the time of the murder, he was convicted based on testimony from neighbors that he abused his wife and their 10-year-old son saw them arguing the same morning. Due to the judge making inappropriate remarks about Synon during the trial and not allowing the defense to show evidence about a boarder who lived at the home at the time and had disappeared right after the murder, a re-trial was ordered. During the new trial, new testimony from a witness described a man who was not Synon entering the home just before the murder leading to his acquittal.
1902	Federal (Arkansas)	Henry Miller was convicted in 1888 for the murder of a hiker he and his friend, William Woods, had met at Commodore Hollow on the Cherokee Nation reserve. After multiple plea's of innocence, it eventually caught the attention of President Harrison's Attorney General H. H. Miller who demanded a more thorough investigation. The secondary investigation brought to light that hiker the two met was actually alive for several weeks after the supposed murder took place and that the witnesses from the original trial were wrong. Despite Woods receiving a pardon in 1889, Henry Miller merely had his sentence commuted to life in prison. After 10 years in prison, Miller reached out to Attorney General Philander Knox. Upon his request, President Theodore Roosevelt pardoned him in 1902.
1905	Pennsylvania	Samuel Greason was convicted in 1901 for the bludgeoning death of the husband of his lover, Kate Edwards. Greason, a black man, was having an affair with the wife of his co-worker, a white woman. She was pregnant at the time of the murder and sentenced to life in prison on testimony given by Greason that she wanted to kill her husband and often complained about him. After her trial, he was arrested on suspicion of being her accomplice due to her having a mixed race baby and the prosecution theorized that was the true motive for the murder. Edwards then testified at his trial that he was the one who actually killed her husband. He was sentenced to death but the execution date was delayed 10 times until the day before his final execution date when she recanted her testimony. He was re-tried and acquitted in 1905 and pardoned in 1914.
1908	Tennessee	Floyd Westfield, a black man, was convicted in 1906 for the murder of Alonzo Rains, a white constable, during a Christmas celebration. Westfield admitted to killing Rains, but said he acted in self-defense. On February 4, 1906, Westfield was convicted of first degree murder and sentenced to death. However, the Tennessee Supreme Court ordered a new trial, finding that a lesser conviction would be more appropriate. Westfield's second trial ended in a hung jury, with one juror favoring a second degree murder conviction, one juror favoring a manslaughter conviction, and two jurors favoring an acquittal. The third trial resulted in Westfield again being convicted of first degree murder and having his death sentence reinstated. However, the Tennessee Supreme Court overturned his conviction, finding that the facts of the case did not warrant a first degree murder conviction. At his fourth trial, the prosecution chose to only try Westfield for manslaughter. On February 25, 1908, Westfield was acquitted and released from custody. It was determined that Constable Rains was abusive and had attacked Westfield, who had committed no crime, without any lawful justification. Constable Rains, who had been courting a local school teacher, became enraged by the noise being made from a nearby party at the home of Westfield's grandmother, where firecrackers and Roman candles were being set. Even as his own friends tried to dissuade him, Rains attacked Westfield's grandmother's house, firing a shot through the door with his pistol. In response, Westfield shot and killed him. The death of Constable Rains contributed to the racist atmosphere that resulted in the lynching of Ed Johnson.

=== 1910s ===
Year	State	Details of Exoneration
1911	Tennessee	David Sherman and two others were convicted in 1907 for the murder of Elisha Hicks. Sherman and Beulah McGhee, both black men, were shooting craps at Bob Henderson's house when Hicks, a white man, was found dead by the railroad tracks. The three were arrested under suspicion they robbed Hicks. A few days before their execution dates, McGhee confessed that he alone had murdered Hicks, leading Governor Malcolm Patterson to order further investigation. McGhee was hanged in 1907, Sherman was pardoned in 1911, and Henderson died in prison in 1912.
1911	Pennsylvania	Andrew Toth was convicted in absentia in 1891 for the beating death of an Irish man during a riot. The riot started when 200 Hungarian workers on strike stormed a factory where Irish strikebreakers were working, leading to the death of 16 men. Toth was convicted on the sole, problematic testimony of a man of Irish descent. After spending almost 19 years in prison, the real murderer, Steve Toth, confessed to the murder when he believed he was dying of typhoid fever. He had fled the country immediately after the riot and his confession had reached Pennsylvania courts leading to Andrew's exoneration. Both men had lived in the same share house, had no resemblance, and were not related.
1911	Massachusetts	Stearns Kendall Abbott was convicted in 1880 of the shooting murder of Maria Crue. Two witnesses placed a bearded transient nearby on the day of the murder with one claiming she saw the man speak with Crue. Abbot was identified as the transient afterwards. Unfortunately, the defense could not find any witnesses to back up the claim that Abbot was on a train bound for Boston at the time or that the main witness, Jennie Carr, was having an affair with the victim's husband and birthed his child. He was convicted and sentenced to hang; however, a witness only known as "a young factory girl from Lowell" claimed that Carr had acknowledged that she had falsely accused Abbott. A few weeks later, the girl's body was found in the Charles River. Multiple citizens groups would push for a pardon until one was granted in 1911 when Abbot was 71.
1912	Federal (North Carolina)	Robert Sawyer and Arthur Adams, who were black, were convicted in 1905 of the racially motivated murders of five crew members, four of whom were white, aboard the Harry A. Berwind. Codefendant Harry Scott was also sentenced to death and executed in 1906. Prior to his execution, he confessed and said he had acted alone. In response, President Theodore Roosevelt commuted their sentences to life imprisonment. Both men were pardoned by President William Howard Taft in 1912.
1913	Florida	J.B. Brown was convicted in 1901 of the shooting death of Harry Wesson. On the day of the murder, the sheriff rounded up a few suspects and threw them in jail. One was the railyard watchman of where the body was found. That night, a jailer claimed to see Brown, a former brakeman on the railyard, talking to the watchman through the fence and telling him to keep his mouth shut. While Brown was held in prison, his cellmate, Alonzo Mitchell, claimed Brown confessed to him, reporting that Brown had admitted he and Jim “J.J.” Johnson had plotted to kill Wesson, and that Brown had shot Wesson with Johnson's gun. Despite refuting most of the witnesses testimony, he was convicted and sentenced to hang. Due to a clerical error, his execution date was postponed and he was able to get his sentence commuted to life in prison. In 1902, the charges against Johnson were dismissed. Almost a decade later, Johnson admitted he committed the murder by himself and Brown was innocent. On the recommendation of the judge and prosecuting attorney, Brown was pardoned but in 1913 and in 1929, sought a pension for his time wrongfully convicted which was granted to him to the total of $2,492, to be paid in monthly installments of $25.
1915	Tennessee	John McElwrath was convicted in 1903 for the murder of Will Wilson. Wilson and McElwrath, black work hands with the Illinois Central Railroad, were both riding freight trains to Mounds, Illinois for their paychecks. However, on the ride back, the train made a sudden stop due to finding Wilson's body on the tracks. McElwrath was found with a revolver that was suspected of being recently fired and arrested. Despite no evidence tying his gun to the actual murder, he was convicted and sentenced to hang. Days before his execution, prompted by letters and petitions from prominent businessmen and Dresden city officials, Governor Frazier commuted his sentence to life in prison. After 10 years, an unknown witness on his deathbed admitted that a friend of his murdered Wilson. Attorney Duke C. Bowers, with the assistance of Selden Maiden, the brother of the judge who had sentenced McElwrath to death, pushed for a pardon. Governor Ben W. Hooper on his last day in office, pardoned McElwrath in 1915. For compensation for his wrongful conviction, the state gave him 25 cents and a train ticket to Dresden, Tennessee.
1917	Illinois	Herman Zajicek was convicted in 1907 for the arsenic murders of a family of five ages 10, 12, 18, and 20-year-old Mary. Police paid little, if any, attention to the 1905 deaths until December 3, 1906, when a Chicago American article suggested Zajicek, a 39-year-old Bohemian fortuneteller, was responsible. Zajicek, who had been performing "magical" services for the family, was suspected along with the matriarch, Rose Vrzal, who was the beneficiary of life insurance policies on the victims. Police questioned the surviving son, 15-year-old Jerry Vrzal, who, after being told that Zajicek had accused him, testified that he overheard Zajicek and his mother plotting the murders to collect insurance. Rose died of apparent arsenic suicide shortly after being taken into custody which prompted the exhumation of the family. Based largely on Jerry's testimony, Zajicek was convicted in 1907 for the murder of Mary Vrzal and sentenced to death, although he was suspected of the other deaths. Thanks to Father P.J. O'Callaghan, Zajick had his execution stayed and in 1908, Jerry Vrzal recanted his testimony, admitting the police pressured him to lie. New evidence also emerged suggesting the involvement of the married daughter, Emma Vrzal Niemann, who Zajicek had accused during his trial. Her father-in-law, Henry Niemann, had died in 1905 while Emma lived with him, and whose body was found to contain arsenic. In 1909, Governor Deneen commuted Zajicek's sentence to life imprisonment due to the false testimony. In 1917, Governor Dunne granted a full pardon based on his innocence. However, he died just four months after his release because his health had deteriorated in prison.
1918	New York	Charles Stielow was convicted in 1915 for the shooting murder of 90-year-old Charles B. Phelps and his housekeeper. A week prior to the murders, Phelps had hired Steilow as a farm hand. He and another farm hand, Nelson Green, lived across the street in a tenant house. Steilow initially denied involvement, but later gave a confession to detectives, claiming Green was the shooter, after being pressured and admitting to earlier lies. Green also confessed but implicated Stielow as the shooter. A key piece of evidence at trial was a ballistics testimony of Dr. Albert Hamilton, a self-proclaimed expert who only had a high school education and a phony medical degree. He concluded Stielow's .22-caliber revolver was the murder weapon without ever test firing it. Despite Stielow's defense arguing the confession was coerced, he was convicted of first degree murder and sentenced to death, while Green later pleaded guilty to second degree murder to avoid the death penalty. Stielow's case attracted attention from advocates who believed his confession was coerced due to his mental limitations, leading to repeated execution stays. During this time, Erwin King confessed to being an accomplice with Clarence F. O'Connell in the murders, though King later retracted his statement. Governor Whitman, after initially commuting Stielow's sentence to life imprisonment due to lingering doubt, funded a reinvestigation led by George H. Bond. Bond's investigation uncovered evidence that Stielow's confession was likely fabricated by detectives and included conclusive ballistics evidence from Captain Henry Jones and Max Poser, a noted expert in microscopy, that proved Stielow's gun was not the murder weapon. Following a second confession by King that implicated himself and O'Connell, Governor Whitman pardoned them.

=== 1920s ===
Year	Details of Exoneration
1920	Frank Jordano, Louisiana. Convicted 1919. The real murderer is now believed to be an unidentified serial killer known as the Axeman of New Orleans.
1920	John Pender, Oregon. Convicted 1913, sentence commuted to life in prison by Governor Oswald West in 1914 after Oregon abolished capital punishment. In 1927, Pender was convicted of raping a 15-year-old girl and sentenced to life in prison. He died in prison in 1950.
1928	George Williams, Fred Dove, and Frank Dove, North Carolina. Convicted 1922, sentences commuted to life in prison by Governor Cameron A. Morrison in 1923. Codefendant William Hardison was also sentenced to death and executed in 1923. Prior to his execution, he confessed and said he had acted alone.
1929	Joseph Weaver, Ohio. Convicted 1927. Weaver's codefendant, Alex Maynor, who received a life sentence after pleading guilty and testifying against Weaver, confessed that he had lied and falsely implicated Weaver. Weaver was promptly granted a retrial and acquitted.

=== 1930s ===
Year	Details of Exoneration
1930	Gangi Cero, Massachusetts. Convicted 1927.
1930	Richard Phillips, Virginia. Convicted 1900, declared insane and sent to a mental hospital in 1901.
1931	William Harper, Virginia. Convicted 1931. Harper was falsely accused of rape by Dorothy Skaggs, a married white woman. Skaggs's motive for the accusation was allegedly to avoid prosecution under the Mann Act for drinking and dancing with another man. Her story fell apart within days after the trial. The judge ordered a new trial immediately and Harper was acquitted a month later after just 32 minutes of deliberation. Skaggs and a friend who testified for the prosecution, Catherine Ketchum, were both arrested and charged with perjury. On July 2, 1931, Skaggs was convicted of perjury and sentenced to five years in prison. However, she was granted a retrial on appeal and acquitted on September 19, 1931. Ketchum's perjury trial ended in a hung jury. The charges against her were dropped after Skaggs was acquitted.
1933	Harry Cashin, New York. Convicted 1931.
1933	Edward Larkman, New York. Convicted 1926, sentence commuted to life in prison by Governor Al Smith in 1927.
1936	Gus Langley, North Carolina. Convicted 1932, sentence commuted to life in prison by Governor John C. B. Ehringhaus in 1933 and paroled in 1934.
1937	Eugene Williams, Willie Roberson, Ozie Powell, Olen Montgomery, and Leroy Wright, Alabama. Convicted 1931. Ozie Powell remained in prison for another conviction until 1943. In 1959, Leroy Wright murdered his wife and then killed himself after finding her at the home of another man.
1938	Ayliff Draper, Arkansas. Convicted 1935, sentence commuted to life in prison in 1936. Codefendant Roy House was also sentenced to death and executed in 1936. Prior to his execution, he confessed and said he had acted alone.
1938	Tom Jones, Kentucky. Convicted 1935. Jones said his pistol had accidentally went off during a struggle with the victim, who was his wife and whom he said had threatened to kill herself.
1939	Thomas Mooney, California. Convicted 1917, sentence commuted to life in prison by Governor William Stephens in 1918.

=== 1940s ===
Year	Details of Exoneration
1940	George Bilger, Pennsylvania. Convicted 1938.
1942	Walter Woodward, Jack Williamson, and Charlie Davis, Florida. Convicted 1933.
1943	William Wellmon, North Carolina. Convicted 1942.
1945	Charles Bernstein, District of Columbia. Convicted 1933, sentence commuted to life in prison by President Franklin D. Roosevelt in 1935, conditionally pardoned in 1940.
1946	Sidney Rudish and Morris Malinski, New York. Convicted 1943.
1948	Lemuel Parrott, North Carolina. Convicted 1947.
1949	Clyde Beale, West Virginia. Convicted 1926, sentence commuted to life in prison by Governor William G. Conley in 1929, conditionally pardoned in 1933.

=== 1950s ===
Year	Details of Exoneration
1951	Horace Wilson, James Thorpe, John McKenzie, and McKinley Forrest, New Jersey. Convicted 1948. Codefendant Ralph Cooper later pleaded no contest and implicated them.
1952	Silas Rogers, Virginia. Convicted 1943, sentence commuted to life in prison by Governor John S. Battle in 1945.
1953	George Lettrich, Illinois. Convicted 1951.
1955	Joseph Taborsky, Connecticut. Convicted 1951. Taborsky later murdered six people and confessed to the murder that initially sent him to death row. He was executed for the subsequent murders in 1960.
1956	Camilo Leyra, New York. Convicted 1950.
1957	L.D. Harris, South Carolina. Convicted 1947, released after conviction was vacated in 1949. The real murderer was later found to be serial killer Monroe Hickson, who confessed after his arrest for an unrelated crime in 1957. Later that year, Hickson pleaded guilty to four counts of murder to avoid the death penalty and received a life sentence. He escaped from prison in 1967 and died a free man in 1968.
1957	Aaron Turner, Pennsylvania. Convicted 1946, sentence commuted to life in prison in 1953.
1958	Harry Dale Bundy, Ohio. Convicted 1957.
1958	James Fulton Foster, Georgia. Convicted 1956.

=== 1960s ===
Year	Details of Exoneration
1961	Thomas Mooney, California. Convicted 1916, sentence commuted to life in prison in 1918.
1962	Robert Lee Kidd, California. Convicted 1960.
1962	James Fair Jr., Georgia. Convicted 1960. Fair, a black man, had been coerced into pleading guilty to the rape and murder of an 8-year-old black girl named Yvonne Holmes just two days after his arrest. Fair, who had no lawyer present, had pleaded guilty after being told that it was his only hope of avoiding a death sentence. In 1961, the Supreme Court of Georgia unanimously granted him a new trial, finding that his civil rights had been violated. The charges against Fair were dropped in 1962.
1962	Isidore Zimmerman, New York. Convicted 1938, sentence commuted to life in prison by Governor Herbert H. Lehman in 1939.
1965	Theodore Jordan, Oregon. Convicted 1932, sentence commuted to life in prison by Governor Julius Meier in 1934.
1966	Robert Ballard Bailey, West Virginia. Convicted 1950, sentence commuted to life in prison by Governor Okey Patteson in 1951, conditionally pardoned by Governor Cecil H. Underwood in 1960. Prior to her death, the victim had said her attacker was "Bob the glass cutter." This resulted in Robert Bailey, who was also known as Bob and worked as a glass cutter, becoming a suspect.
1967	James Giles and John Giles, Maryland. Convicted 1961, sentences commuted to life in prison by Governor J. Millard Tawes in 1963. Codefendant Joseph Johnson was also exonerated in 1968. The Giles brothers were convicted of their participation in the alleged gang rape of a 16-year-old girl. The men were freed after the girl refused to testify again.
1968	Joseph Johnson, Maryland. Convicted 1962, sentence commuted to life in prison by Governor J. Millard Tawes in 1963. Codefendants James and John Giles were both exonerated in 1967. Johnson was convicted of his participation in the alleged gang rape of a 16-year-old girl. The men were freed after the girl refused to testify again.
1969	Paul Kern Imbler, California. Convicted 1961.

=== 1970s ===
Year	Details of Exoneration
1971	Lloyd Eldon Miller, Illinois. Convicted 1956, released on bail in 1967.
1973	Dave Roby Keaton, Florida. Convicted 1971. Remained in prison until 1979 for armed robbery.
1974	Anthony Carey, North Carolina. Convicted 1973. The real murderer was found to be Anthony's brother, Albert Carey. In 1974, Albert Carey was convicted of first degree murder and sentenced to death. In 1976, his sentence was commuted to life in prison as a result of Woodson v. North Carolina. Albert Carey was paroled in 2007 and discharged from parole in 2012.
1975	Freddie Pitts and Wilbur Lee, Florida. Convicted 1963, sentences commuted to life in prison in 1972.
1975	Clarence Smith Jr., Ronald Keine, Richard Greer, and Thomas Gladish, New Mexico. Convicted 1974. The real murderer, Kerry Rodney Lee, turned himself in and confessed. In 1977, Lee pleaded guilty to second degree murder and was sentenced to 15 to 55 years in prison.
1975	Christopher Spicer, North Carolina. Convicted 1973.
1975	James Creamer, Georgia. Convicted 1973, sentence commuted to life in prison in 1973.
1976	Clarence Norris, Alabama. Convicted 1931, sentence commuted to life in prison by Governor Bibb Graves in 1938, paroled in 1946.
1977	Delbert Tibbs, Florida. Convicted in 1974.
1978	Earl Patrick Charles, Georgia. Convicted 1975.
1978	Gary Radi, Montana. Convicted 1975.
1979	Gary Beeman, Ohio. Convicted 1976.

=== 1980s ===
Year	Details of Exoneration
1980	Jerry Banks, Georgia. Convicted 1975. In 1981, Jerry Banks murdered his wife, Virginia Banks, and then killed himself. Jerry had recently agreed to grant his wife custody of their three children after she filed for divorce.
1980	Larry Hicks, Indiana. Convicted 1978. Codefendant Bernard Skates told fellow inmates that he had acted alone, but hanged himself in jail before he could testify.
1981	Michael Linder, South Carolina. Convicted 1979. Linder, a white man charged with murdering a black police officer, was acquitted after arguing self-defense. The prosecution claimed that he had planted the spent cartridges. In 1987, Linder kidnapped, beat, and raped a young woman, then beat a 16-year-old boy who tried to intervene. He then forced the woman into his car and drove away while drunk. Minutes later, he hit a car occupied by three women head-on, killing one. Linder was convicted of kidnapping and assault and sentenced to life in prison.
1981	Johnny Ross, Louisiana. Convicted 1975, sentence commuted to life in prison in 1977.
1982	Lawyer Johnson, Massachusetts. Convicted 1972, sentence commuted to life in prison in 1974.
1986	Anthony Silah Brown, Florida. Convicted 1983.
1986	Neil Ferber, Pennsylvania. Convicted 1981.
1986	Clifford Henry Bowen, Oklahoma. Convicted 1981.
1987	Joseph Green Brown. Florida. Convicted 1974. In 2012, Brown was charged with the murder of his wife in North Carolina. In 2013, he pleaded guilty to second degree murder and was sentenced to 15 to 19 years in prison.
1987	Perry Cobb and Darby J. Tillis. Illinois. Convicted 1979. The primary witness in the case, Phyllis Santini, was determined to be an accomplice of the real murderer by the Illinois Supreme Court. The judge in the case, Thomas J. Maloney, was later convicted of accepting bribes.
1987	Juan Ramos, Florida. Convicted 1983.
1987	Robert Wallace, Georgia. Convicted 1980.
1987	Anthony Ray Peek, Florida. Convicted 1978. Peek remains in prison, where he is serving a life sentence for an unrelated 1977 rape conviction.
1988	Robert Craig Cox, Florida. Convicted 1988. After his acquittal, Cox was returned to California to finish a prison sentence for a 1985 kidnapping. In 1995, Cox was arrested for holding a gun on a 12-year-old girl during a robbery in Texas. He was convicted of aggravated robbery and sentenced to life in prison on account of his three prior felony convictions, one for kidnapping and two for assault with a deadly weapon. Cox remains a suspect in the 1992 disappearances of a mother and two teenage girls, as well as a separate abduction, in Texas.
1988	Willie Brown and Larry Troy, Florida. Convicted 1983. Brown, who was serving a 20-year sentence for robbery, was released from prison in 1988. Troy, who was serving a 25-year sentence for another murder, was released from prison in 1990. Both men were later sent back to prison for robbery.
1989	Randall Dale Adams, Texas. Convicted 1977, sentence commuted to life in prison in 1980. He was exonerated as a result of information uncovered by film-maker Errol Morris and presented in an acclaimed 1988 documentary The Thin Blue Line. Adams was released and all charges were dropped in December 1988. The real murderer, 16-year-old Davis Ray Harris, had been the chief prosecution witness against Adams. Harris was later sentenced to death for another murder in 1985 and executed in 2004.
1989	James Joseph Richardson, Florida. Convicted 1968, sentence commuted to life in prison in 1972. The real murderer has been alleged to be Bessie Reece, the babysitter of the victims, who were Richardson's seven children. Reece died of Alzheimer's disease in a nursing home in 1992.

=== 1990s ===
Year	Details of Exoneration
1990	Clarence Brandley, Texas. Convicted 1981.
1990	Dale Johnston, Ohio. Convicted 1984. The real murderer was found to be Chester McKnight, who was serving a 12-year sentence for sex crimes against children. In 2008, McKnight pleaded guilty to two counts of aggravated murder to avoid the death penalty and was sentenced to life in prison. Another man, Kenny Linscott, pleaded guilty to abuse of a corpse and was sentenced to time served.
1991	Gary Nelson, Georgia. Convicted 1980.
1991	Charles Smith, Indiana. Convicted 1983.
1992	Jay C. Smith, Pennsylvania. Convicted 1986. In 2000, an appellate court, which rejected a civil suit filed by Smith, concluded that he was guilty, but nevertheless protected from a retrial under double jeopardy.
1993	Walter McMillian, Alabama. Convicted 1988. McMillian was convicted despite no physical evidence connecting him to the murder of 18 year old Ronda Morrison. Testimony against him was later proven to be false, perjured and outright fabricated by prosecution witnesses. Due to the judicial override imposition of the death penalty in his case, McMillian's case was taken up by attorney Bryan Stevenson. Following a series of petitions and appeals before the Alabama Court of Criminal Appeals, McMillian's conviction was reversed, judges unanimously concurring the state suppressed exculpatory evidence.
1993	Gregory Wilhoit, Oklahoma. Convicted 1987. Along with Ron Williamson, Wilhoit later became the subject of John Grisham's 2006 non-fiction book The Innocent Man: Murder and Injustice in a Small Town.
1993	Kirk Bloodsworth, Maryland. Convicted 1985, sentence commuted to life in prison in 1987. The real murderer was found to be Kimberly Shay Ruffner, who was serving a 45-year sentence for burglary, attempted rape, and assault with intent to murder. In 2004, Ruffner pleaded guilty to first degree murder to avoid the death penalty and received a life sentence, to be served consecutively with his other sentences.
1993	Muneer Deeb, Texas. Convicted 1985. Deeb, who was accused of inadvertently arranging the 1982 Lake Waco murders, was acquitted after one of his codefendants refused to testify against him again. Deeb and codefendant David Spence became suspects after two witnesses overheard them arguing loudly in front of a store about the murders. Codefendant David Spence was also sentenced to death and executed in 1997. Codefendants Anthony and Gilbert Melendez both received life sentences. Gilbert Melendez died in prison in 1998 and Anthony Melendez died in prison in 2017.
1993	Larry Hudson, Louisiana. Convicted 1967, sentence commuted to life in prison in 1972.
1993	Federico Macias, Texas. Convicted 1984.
1993	James Albert Robison, Arizona. Convicted 1977. After his acquittal, Robison pleaded guilty in federal court for soliciting a fellow inmate to murder codefendant John Harvey Anderson while awaiting his retrial, at which he was acquitted, and was sentenced to five years in prison. He was released from prison in 1998.
1994	Andrew Golden, Florida. Convicted 1991. In 1996, Golden was arrested for molesting two girls, ages 8 and 9, in Texas. He pleaded guilty to indecency with a child and was sentenced to 15 years in prison.
1995	Robert Charles Cruz, Arizona. Convicted 1981. Cruz, an alleged crime boss, was murdered in 1997 and his remains were found in 2007. Codefendants Edward McCall Jr., William Bracy, and Murray Hooper remained on death row. McCall died on death row in 2000, Bracy died on death row in 2002, and Hooper was executed in 2022.
1995	Rolando Cruz and Alejandro Hernandez, Illinois. Convicted 1985, Hernandez's sentence was commuted to 80 years imprisonment in 1991. Cruz became a suspect after lying to the police in an attempt to claim the $10,000 reward, while Hernandez became a suspect after falsely accusing two other men of the murder. The real murderer was found to be serial killer Brian Dugan, who was serving a life sentence for the rape and murder of two women. In 2009, Dugan pleaded guilty to murder and was sentenced to death. In 2011, his sentence was commuted to life in prison by Governor Pat Quinn after Illinois abolished the death penalty. In 1996, seven law enforcement officials were acquitted of conspiring to convict Cruz. Some jurors expressed doubts about whether Cruz had no involvement in the murder. After his first conviction, Cruz had turned towards Nicarico's sister and mouthed, "You're next."
1995	Sabrina Butler, Mississippi. Convicted 1990. It is now speculated that the death of the victim, who was Butler's infant son, was caused by a kidney malady. However, no definitive cause of death was ever established. Butler's co-counsel said the case was that of manslaughter at best. Neither the jury at Butler's first trial nor her retrial were informed that she had previously lost custody of another child for abusing them.
1995	Adolph Munson, Oklahoma. Convicted 1985. Munson remained in prison under a life sentence for a double murder in 1965 and died in prison in 2007. He became a suspect after fleeing from a work release program.
1996	Verneal Jimerson and Dennis Williams, Illinois. Convicted 1985. Codefendants Kenneth Adams, Willie Rainge, and Paul Gray, who received prison terms ranging from 50 years to life in prison, were also exonerated. Gray had been released from prison under a plea agreement in 1987. The real murderers were found to be Arthur Robinson, Juan Rodriguez, Ira Johnson, and Dennis Johnson, the last of whom had died of a drug overdose in 1993. In 1997, Robinson, Rodriguez, and Ira Johnson all pleaded guilty to murder to avoid the death penalty and were sentenced to life in prison. Rodriguez's sentence was later reduced to 65 years on appeal.
1996	Gary Gauger, Illinois. Convicted 1993, sentnece commuted to life in prison in 1994. The real murderers were found to be Outlaws Motorcycle Club members Randall E. Miller and James W. Schneider. Both men were tried for murder in aid of racketeering in federal court. In 1998, Schneider pleaded guilty and was sentenced to 45 years in prison. In 2000, Miller was convicted and sentenced to life in prison.
1996	Joseph Burrows, Illinois. Convicted 1989. Gayle Potter and codefendant Ralph Frye were sentenced to 5 and 10 years in prison, respectively, for perjury for giving false testimony against Burrows. Frye had also been wrongfully convicted and was sentenced to 23 years in prison. Due to time served, he was released after pleading guilty to perjury.
1996	David Grannis, Arizona. Convicted 1991. Codefendant Daniel Webster was also sentenced to death. His sentence was commuted to life in prison in 1997.
1996	Troy Lee Jones, California. Convicted 1982. The real murderer was found to be Marlow Jones, who confessed to the murder.
1996	Carl Lawson, Illinois. Convicted 1990. The alleged real murderer, Milton Wilson, had since died from a drug overdose.
1996	Roberto Miranda, Nevada. Convicted 1982.
1997	Ricardo Aldape Guerra, Texas. Convicted 1982. The evidence indicated that Guerra had still been an accomplice to the murder. However, he could not be retried since he had been indicted as the triggerman rather than as an accomplice under the law of parties. Guerra died in a car crash in Mexico four months later.
1997	Benjamin Harris, Washington. Convicted 1984.
1997	Robert Earl Hayes, Florida. Convicted 1991. In 2003, Hayes was arrested and charged with the 1987 murder of Leslie Dickenson in New York. Dickenson's death was initially ruled a suicide, but the case was reinvestigated after the 1990 murder in Florida that sent Hayes to death row. In 2004, Hayes pleaded guilty to manslaughter, arson, and burglary, and was sentenced to 15 to 45 years in prison. Florida prosecutors urged the New York Parole Board to not release Hayes, saying there was enough evidence to conclude that he was likely guilty of the 1990 murder even though there wasn't enough for a conviction. Hayes sought DNA testing to prove his innocence. However, in 2022, the results of the DNA tests proved his guilt in the murder.
1997	Christopher McCrimmon, Arizona. Convicted 1993. McCrimmon remained in prison until 2020 for attempted murder, armed robbery, aggravated assault, and burglary. Codefendant Andre Minnnit was also exonerated in 2002, remained in prison until 2025 for similar crimes. Codefendant Martin Raul Soto-Fong was also sentenced to death, but his sentence was commuted to life in prison in 2005 since he was 17 at the time of the murders.
1997	Larry Randal Padgett, Alabama. Convicted 1992.
1998	Curtis Kyles, Louisiana. Convicted 1984. In 2010, Kyles was charged with the murder of a woman, whom he shot execution-style after an argument. In 2015, Kyles was convicted of second degree murder and sentenced to life in prison.
1999	Shareef Cousin, Louisiana. Convicted 1996. Remained in prison until 2005 for related robbery convictions.
1999	Anthony Porter, Illinois. Convicted 1983. In 2005, Porter lost a civil case after a jury found that his original conviction was justified. The 2014 documentary A Murder in the Park argued that Porter, who had been identified as the murderer by six eyewitnesses, was guilty, while Alstory Simon, who was initially said to be "real murderer" but was exonerated in 2014, was framed by Professor David Protess and his team from Northwestern University, who sought to undermine the death penalty in Illinois rather than learn the actual truth about the murders. Both witnesses, Simon's estranged wife and a paid actor, were paid by Protess and his team. Simon's estranged wife later recanted her statements.
1999	Ron Williamson, Oklahoma. Convicted 1988. Along with Gregory R. Wilhoit, Williamson later became the inspiration for and subject of John Grisham's 2006 non-fiction book The Innocent Man: Murder and Injustice in a Small Town. Codefendant Dennis Fritz, who was serving a life sentence, was also exonerated. The real murderer was found to be Glen Dale Gore. In 2003, Gore was convicted of first degree murder and sentenced to death. In 2006, his sentence was reduced to life in prison without parole after a retrial.
1999	Ronald Jones, Illinois. Convicted 1989.
1999	Clarence Richard Dexter Jr., Missouri. Convicted 1991.
1999	Alfred Rivera, North Carolina. Convicted 1997. In 2001, Rivera was sentenced to life in prison for related federal drug trafficking charges. The life sentence was imposed on account of his prior convictions. Rivera was released from prison under the First Step Act in 2019.
1999	Steven Smith, Illinois. Convicted 1986.

=== 2000s ===
Year	Details of Exoneration
2000	Earl Washington Jr., Virginia. Convicted 1984, sentence commuted to life in prison by Governor Douglas Wilder in 1994. Remained in prison until 2001 for burglary and malicious wounding. The real murderer was found to be Kenenth Tinsley, who was serving a life sentence for rape. In 2007, Tinsley pleaded guilty to capital murder and rape to avoid the death penalty. As part of his plea agreement, Tinsley received two consecutive life sentences and agreed to waive his right to become eligible for parole.
2000	Frank Lee Smith, Florida. Convicted 1985. Exoneration was posthumous for Smith, who died in prison earlier that year. Smith became a suspect since he had two prior homicide convictions, the first for manslaughter when he was 13 and the second for first degree murder when he was 18, and was on parole for his second conviction at the time of the murder. The real murderer was found to be serial killer Eddie Mosley. Mosley was not tried since he had been found incompetent to stand trial.
2000	Eric Clemmons, Missouri. Convicted 1987. Clemmons remains in prison, where he is serving a life sentence for another murder.
2000	Hubert Geralds Jr., Illinois. Convicted 1997. Geralds, a serial killer, remained on death row for five other murders, but had his sentence commuted to life in prison in 2003. The real murderer in the specific case for which Geralds was wrongfully convicted was found to be serial killer Andre Crawford.
2000	Michael Graham, Louisiana. Convicted 1987.
2000	Joseph Green, Florida. Convicted 1993, released on bail in 1999.
2000	Oscar Morris, California. Convicted 1983, sentence commuted to life in prison in 1988. Morris, who had pleaded guilty to second degree murder and voluntary manslaughter in unrelated cases, was released on time served.
2000	William Nieves, Pennsylvania. Convicted 1994.
2001	Charles Irvin Fain, Idaho. Convicted 1983. The real murderer was found to be David Dalrymple, who was serving 20 years to life for kidnapping, lewd conduct with minor, and sexual abuse of minor. In 2024, Dalrymple pleaded guilty to first degree murder and rape to avoid the death penalty and was sentenced to life in prison.
2001	Albert Burrell, Louisiana. Convicted 1987.
2001	Gary Drinkard, Alabama. Convicted 1995.
2001	Louis Greco, Peter Limone, and Enrico Tameleo, Massachusetts. Convicted 1968, sentences commuted to life in prison in 1972. Exonerations were posthumous for Tameleo and Greco, who had died in prison in 1985 and 1995, respectively. Codefendants Wilfred French and Joe Salvati, who both received life sentences, were also exonerated.
2001	Joaquin Jose Martinez, Florida. Convicted 1997. Martinez made several incriminating statements to his wife in a phone conversation prior to his arrest. He was acquitted after the entire phone conversation was suppressed on appeal since other parts of the conversation were inaudible.
2002	Juan Roberto Melendez-Colon, Florida. Convicted 1984.
2002	Ray Krone, Arizona. Convicted 1992, sentence commuted to life in prison in 1996. The real murderer was found to be Kenneth Phillips, who was in prison for kidnapping and attempted child molestation. In 2006, Phillips pleaded guilty to first degree murder to avoid the death penalty and was sentenced to life in prison.
2002	Thomas Kimbell, Pennsylvania. Convicted 1998.
2002	Andre Minnitt, Arizona. Convicted 1993. Minnitt remained in prison until 2025 for attempted murder, armed robbery, aggravated assault, and burglary. Codefendant Christopher McCrimmon had been exonerated in 1997, but remained in prison until 2021 for similar crimes. Codefendant Martin Raul Soto-Fong was also sentenced to death, but his death sentence was commuted to life in prison in 2005 since he was 17 at the time of the murders.
2002	Larry Osborne, Kentucky. Convicted 1999. The testimony of Joe Reid, a friend who implicated Osborne in the murder, was suppressed since he drowned in a swimming accident prior to the trial. As such, the Kentucky Supreme Court ruled that the introduction of this testimony had violated the Confrontation Clause.
2003	Nicholas Yarris, Pennsylvania. Convicted 1982. Yarris became a suspect after falsely accusing another man of the murder.
2003	John Thompson, Louisiana. Convicted 1985, sentence commuted to life in prison in 2001.
2003	Joseph Amrine, Missouri. Convicted 1986. Amrine was under a separate 15-year sentence for first degree robbery, burglary, and forgery. He was released on time served.
2003	Madison Hobley, Illinois. Convicted 1990, pardoned by Governor George Ryan on account of confession being obtained under torture.
2003	Rudolph Holton, Florida. Convicted 1986. In 2003, Flemmie Birkins and Johnny Newsome both pleaded guilty to perjury for giving false testimony against Holton and were sentenced to 13 years and 14 years in prison, respectively. In 2004, Holton pleaded guilty to aggravated battery for striking the woman with a golf club and to misdemeanor assault for a confrontation with a cousin. He was sentenced to two years in prison. In 2006, Holton, who now had 11 prior felony convictions, was convicted of attempted second degree murder and domestic battery for choking his wife and sentenced to 20 years in prison.
2003	Stanley Howard, Illinois. Convicted 1987, pardoned by Governor George Ryan on account of confession being obtained under torture. Howard remained in prison for rape and kidnapping until 2023. He maintained his innocence for these lesser crimes, but DNA tests confirmed his guilt in 2004.
2003	Timothy Howard and Gary Lamar James, Ohio. Convicted 1977, sentence commuted to life in prison in 1978.
2003	Leroy Orange, Illinois. Convicted 1985, pardoned by Governor George Ryan on account of confession being obtained under torture. Codefendant Leonard Kidd remained on death row, but his sentence was commuted to life in prison in 2003.
2003	Aaron Patterson, Illinois. Convicted 1989, pardoned on account of confession being obtained under torture.
2003	Lemuel Prion, Arizona. Convicted 1999. Prion, who previously served time in prison for raping a 15-year-old girl, was returned to Utah to finish serving a sentence for aggravated assault and possession of a dangerous weapon in a correctional facility and was eventually paroled. On August 27, 2023, Prion was shot and killed by Sage Daves in Utah. In 2025, Daves, who said Prion had lunged at him with a pitchfork during an argument after threatening to kill him, pleaded guilty to manslaughter and was sentenced to 1 to 15 years in prison.
2003	Wesley Quick, Alabama. Convicted 1997. Quick was retried for three related burglaries that took place shortly before the double murder that sent him to death row. In 2003, he pleaded guilty to two counts of first degree burglary and one count of third degree burglary and was sentenced to 76 years in prison. The severity of the sentence was based on the fact that the weapons stolen in two of the burglaries were used to commit the murders.
2004	Alan Gell, North Carolina. Convicted 1995. Two 15-year-old girls, Crystal Morris and Shanna Hall, had received 10-year sentences for second degree murder after pleading guilty and testifying Gell, who was known for illegally having sex with teenage girls and had a prior conviction for statutory rape, in a plea agreement. Morris later recanted her testimony. In 2006, Gell pleaded guilty to statutory rape for impregnating a 15-year-old girl and was sentenced to five years in prison.
2004	Ernest Willis, Texas. Convicted 1987. The two victims in the case were killed in a fire, although the cause of the fire now undetermined. In 2004, Willis's conviction was overturned by a federal judge on the grounds that Willis had been unnecessarily drugged during his trial and his lawyers had failed to present evidence showing that it would've been out of character for Willis to set the fire. Although Willis had a past history of setting fires, he had no history of violence and had once saved a boy from drowning. New investigators found no evidence of an arson, although another death row inmate, David Martin Long, made a detailed confession to setting the fire. However, Long said that he had acted alone. In his decision to not retry Willis, district attorney Ori White concluded that although the fire may have been intentionally set, he did not believe Willis was involved.
2004	Ryan Matthews, Louisiana. Convicted 1999. The real murderer is now believed to be Rondell Love, who was serving a 20-year sentence for manslaughter.
2004	Laurence Adams, Massachusetts. Convicted 1974, sentence commuted to life in prison in 1975. Codefendant Harry Ambers was also sentenced to death, but his sentence was commuted to life in prison in 1975. Police withheld a statement from Ambers that he and his brother, Warren Ambers, had acted alone.
2004	Dan L. Bright, Louisiana. Convicted 1996.
2004	Patrick Croy, California. Convicted 1979, released in 1990 after most serious convictions were overturned. A jury found that he had killed the victim, police officer Jesse Hittson, in self-defense. Croy had used an intoxication defense at his original trial.
2004	Gordon Steidl, Illinois. Convicted 1987, sentence commuted to life in prison in 1999.
2005	Derrick Jamison, Ohio. Convicted 1985.
2005	Harold C. Wilson, Pennsylvania. Convicted 1989.
2007	Curtis McCarty, Oklahoma. Convicted 1986.
2007	Jonathon Hoffman, North Carolina. Convicted 1996.
2007	Michael Lee McCormick, Tennessee. Convicted 1987.
2008	Kennedy Brewer, Mississippi. Convicted 1995. The real murderer was found to be Justin Johnson. Johnson also confessed to another murder for which another man, Levon Brooks, had been wrongfully convicted and received a life sentence. In 2012, Johnson pleaded guilty to both murders to avoid the death penalty and received a life sentence.
2008	Glen Edward Chapman, North Carolina. Convicted 1995.
2008	Levon Jones, North Carolina. Convicted 1993.
2008	Michael Blair, Texas. Convicted 1994. Blair remains in prison, where he is serving four life sentences for raping four children, including those of a witness who testified against him in the murder case. Blair has admitted his guilt in the rapes.
2009	Herman Lindsey, Florida. Convicted 2006.
2009	Nathson Fields, Illinois. Convicted 1986, sentence commuted to life in prison in 2003.
2009	Paul House, Tennessee. Convicted 1986.
2009	Daniel Wade Moore, Alabama. Convicted 2002.
2009	Ronald Kitchen, Illinois. Convicted 1988, sentence commuted to life in prison in 2003.
2009	Michael Toney, Texas. Convicted 1999. Toney died in a car accident on October 3, 2009, just one month and a day after his exoneration.
2009	Yancy Douglas, Oklahoma. Convicted 1995.
2009	Paris Powell, Oklahoma. Convicted 1997.
2009	Robert Springsteen, Texas. Convicted 2001, sentence commuted to life in prison in 2005. Codefendant Michael Scott, who received a life sentence, was also exonerated, The real murderer was found to be serial killer Robert Eugene Brashers, who killed himself in 1999.

=== 2010s ===
Year	Details of Exoneration
2010	Anthony Charles Graves, Texas. Convicted 1994. Codefendant Robert Earl Carter was also sentenced to death and executed in 2000. At his execution, Carter confessed and said he had acted alone.
2011	Joe Arridy, Colorado. Executed 1939. Posthumously pardoned. Codefendant Francisco Aguilar was also sentenced to death and executed in 1937. Prior to his execution, Aguilar said he had acted alone and only implicated Arridy in his confession under coercion.
2011	Gussie Vann, Tennessee. Convicted 1984. The death of the victim, who was Vann's 8-year-old daughter, is now believed to have been caused by her falling on a bed sheet tied to a drawer of the dresser in a knot that was extremely tight. Vann remains in prison, where he is serving a 50-year sentence for two related aggravated rape convictions. After being wrongfully accused of murder, Vann had been truthfully accused of rape by his 12-year-old niece, who said he raped her twice. Vann pleaded guilty in this case.
2012	Damon Thibodeaux, Louisiana. Convicted 1997.
2012	Seth Penalver, Florida. Convicted 1994.
2012	Joe D'Ambrosio, Ohio. Convicted 1989.
2012	Dale Johnston, Ohio. Convicted 1984, case dismissed in 1990.
2013	Reginald Griffin, Missouri. Convicted 1983, sentence commuted to life in prison in 1993. Griffin was under a separate 20-year sentence for armed assault. He was released on time served.
2014	Glenn Ford, Louisiana. Convicted 1984. Ford was later denied compensation by the state of Louisiana for his wrongful conviction after a court determined that he was still guilty of lesser charges directly related to the crime. The court found that given the underlying facts, Ford could've still been convicted of second degree murder. It also found sufficient evidence to conclude that Ford was still guilty of being an accessory after the fact to first degree murder, conspiracy to commit armed robbery, being a principle to armed robbery, and illegal possession of stolen things.
2014	Carl Dausch, Florida. Convicted 2011. In 2006, Dausch, who was serving a 60-year sentence in Indiana for 1990 convictions for rape, criminal confinement, and battery when he was tied to the scene of the murder, which was committed in 1987. He was linked to DNA on a cigarette found on the victim's car and fingerprints on a cigarette lighter wrapper found inside the car. Prior to jury selection, Dausch hanged himself in a suicide attempt though survived. Dausch later testified that he had hitchhiked a ride with the person whom he said must have been real murderer. However, this was inconsistent with the testimony of an eyewitness that he saw only one person, whom he thought was Dasuch. The Supreme Court of Florida ruled 6-1 that the evidence was insufficient, in part because DNA tests failed to conclusively prove that Dausch was the one to rape the victim. Dausch was returned to Indiana to finish his sentence for his proven crimes. He was released from prison in 2018.
2014	Henry McCollum and Leon Brown, North Carolina. Convicted 1984, Brown's sentence commuted to life in prison in 1992. The real murderer was found to be Roscoe Artis, who was initially on death row for another murder before having his sentence reduced to life in prison on appeal. Artis died in prison in 2020.
2014	Ricky Jackson, Ronnie Bridgeman, and Wiley Bridgeman, Ohio. Convicted 1975, Jackson's sentence commuted to life in prison in 1977 and sentences of Bridgeman brothers commuted to life in prison in 1978. Ronnie Bridgeman had been paroled in 2003.
2015	Debra Milke, Arizona. Convicted 1990. Codefendants James Lynn Styers and Roger Mark Scott remain on death row. In 2020, Milke lost a civil suit claiming wrongful conviction. A federal judge found that Milke had repeatedly and intentionally tampered with evidence in the case, destroying evidence that could potentially incriminate her. Scott maintains that Milke was the mastermind of the murder.
2015	Anthony Ray Hinton, Alabama. Convicted 1985.
2015	Willie Manning, Mississippi. Convicted 1996. Manning remains on death row for a double murder.
2015	Alfred Brown, Texas. Convicted 2005.
2015	Lawrence William Lee, Georgia. Convicted 1987. Lee remains in prison, where he is serving a life sentence for another murder.
2015	Derral Wayne Hodgkins, Florida. Convicted 2013.
2017	Isaiah McCoy, Delaware. Convicted 2010, sentence commuted to life in prison in 2016. McCoy had previously told a prison guard that he was a murderer, albeit this was not used as evidence against him. In 2025, McCoy was sentenced to life in prison for federal sex trafficking charges in Hawaii.
2017	Rodricus Crawford, Louisiana. Convicted 2013. It is now believed that the death of the victim, who was Crawford's 1-year-old son, had died from bronchopneumonia and sepsis.
2017	Ralph Wright, Florida. Convicted 2014.
2017	Rickey Newman, Arkansas. Convicted 2002.
2017	Gabriel Solache, Illinois. Convicted 2000, sentence commuted to life in prison in 2003.
2017	Robert Miller, Oklahoma. Convicted 1988, acquitted in 1998. The real murderer was found to be Ronald Lott, who was serving a 25-year sentence for rape and burglary. In 2002, Lott was convicted of two counts of first degree murder and sentenced to death. He was executed in 2013.
2018	Vicente Benavides, California. Convicted 1993. Benavides was convicted of the rape and murder of his girlfriend's 21-month-old daughter. The girl had not been raped and a court found that her injuries could've been sustained in a car accident.
2018	Clemente Aguirre-Jarquin, Florida. Convicted 2006.
2019	Paul Browning, Nevada. Convicted 1986.
2019	Clifford Williams, Florida. Convicted 1976, sentence commuted to life in prison in 1980. Codefendant Hubert Myers, who received a life sentence, was also exonerated.
2019	Charles Finch, North Carolina. Convicted 1976, sentence commuted to life in prison in 1977.
2019	Christopher Williams, Pennsylvania. Convicted 1993. Williams was accused of six murders, convicted of four of them, and sentenced to death for three of his convictions. His convictions for the three murders for which he received death sentences were overturned in 2019, but he remained in prison until 2021, when his last murder conviction was also overturned. Williams was murdered in 2022.

=== 2020s ===
Year	Details of Exoneration
2020	Robert DuBoise, Florida. Convicted 1985, sentence commuted to life in prison in 1988. The real murderer was found to be serial killer Abron Scott, who was serving a life sentence for another murder and was linked to a third murder. In 2024, Scott pleaded guilty to two counts of first degree murder to avoid the death penalty and received a life sentence. His alleged accomplice, Amos Robinson, is awaiting trial.
2020	Curtis Flowers, Mississippi. Convicted 1997.
2020	Kareem Johnson, Pennsylvania. Convicted 2007. Johnson remains in prison, where he is serving a life sentence for another murder.
2020	Roderick Johnson, Pennsylvania. Convicted 1997.
2020	Walter Ogrod, Pennsylvania. Convicted 1996.
2021	Sherwood Brown, Mississippi. Convicted 1995.
2021	Eddie Lee Howard, Jr., Mississippi. Convicted 1994.
2021	Barry Williams, California. Convicted 1986. Williams remained in prison for another murder. He was denied parole in 2022, but is no longer listed as an inmate in the California Department of Corrections and Rehabilitation as of 2025. A civil suit filed by Williams was dismissed the same year.
2022	Alexander McClay Williams, Pennsylvania. Executed 1931. Conviction overturned posthumously. The real murderer may have been the victim's abusive ex-husband.
2023	Glynn Simmons, Oklahoma. Convicted 1975, sentence commuted to life in prison in 1977.
2024	Celia, Missouri. Executed 1855. Posthumously pardoned. Celia killed her master in self-defense when he tried to rape her.
2025	Elwood Jones Jr., Ohio. Convicted 1996.

== See also ==
- Wrongful execution
- Death row
- Miscarriage of justice
- List of death row inmates in the United States
- List of women on death row in the United States
- List of wrongful convictions in the United States
