= Bo Jones =

Bo Jones may refer to:

- Boisfeuillet Jones, Jr. (born 1946), American newspaper executive
- Bo Jones (Lost Girl), fictional character in Lost Girl TV series
- Levon Jones, also known as Bo Jones, American former death row inmate
