= Juan Roberto Melendez-Colon =

American activist (born 1951)

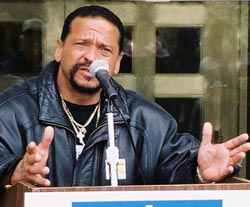
- Born: May 24, 1951 (age 75); Brooklyn, New York, United States
- Occupations: Public speaker, activist
- Known for: 99th death row inmate in the United States to be exonerated and released from prison since 1973

Juan Roberto Melendez-Colon (born May 24, 1951) is a public speaker and human rights activist who was wrongly convicted of murder and spent over 17 years on death row. He was released from prison on January 3, 2002, making him the 99th death row inmate in the United States to be exonerated and released from prison since 1973.

== Early life ==
Melendez was born in Brooklyn, New York, in 1951, then fled to Puerto Rico when he was 8 years old to escape an abusive stepfather. At the age of 17 he returned to the United States mainland and eventually raised a family with his common-law wife.

In 1974 Melendez was arrested in Florida for an armed robbery and spent over six years in prison. He then returned to life as a migrant farmer until FBI agents arrested him in Pennsylvania at the age of 33. He was charged for the 1983 Florida murder in his Auburndale beauty salon of Delbert 'Mr. Del' Baker, a man Melendez claims to have never met.

== The case ==
In his own defense, Melendez testified that he was with a woman named Dorothy Rivera on the evening of September 13, 1983–an alibi which was supported by the testimony of four witnesses. There was also no physical evidence tying Melendez to the murder scene.

Despite a lack of physical evidence, Melendez was convicted largely on testimony of David Luna Falcon, an informant with a criminal record and whose parents were said to have had a "falling-out" with Melendez. Witnesses testified during Melendez's trial that Falcon had a grudge against Melendez and had threatened to kill him prior to reporting to the police that Melendez had confessed his involvements in Delbert Baker's murder.

There was also some crucial testimony which was omitted at trial, such as:

- The accounts of a witness named Terry Barber; Barber had dropped by Delbert Baker's workplace on the evening of the murder and had reported to police that he saw two males, a man named Vernon James and a man whom Barber knew simply as "Bobo". He did not report ever seeing Melendez. Police apparently dropped that lead when both of the males in question denied that they were at Baker's place of business on the night in question.
- A taped statement made by Vernon James indicating that he and his accomplice had killed Baker at his salon.
- A statement made by an inmate named Roger Mims, who claimed that Vernon James had admitted having a sexual relationship with Baker and that he had killed him along with two other men.

Melendez was also at a disadvantage in that he was unable to read or write English and was said to have a ninth-grade education level.

They never give me an interpreter. At that time, if I say five words in English, three of them would have been cuss words.

— Juan Melendez, Oakland Tribune (April 11, 2005)

In the end, Melendez was found guilty and sentenced to death.

== Appeals and release ==
Melendez's conviction and death sentence were upheld on appeal three times by the Florida Supreme Court. Sixteen years after his conviction, Melendez was nearing the end of his appeals when his current attorneys conducted a search through the files of Melendez's original defense lawyer and discovered the taped confession made by Vernon James. They were also able to locate other witnesses who recalled that Vernon James had confessed to the murder before he died.

In light of the new evidence, Justice Barbara Fleischer determined that Melendez was entitled to a new trial. In turn, the state of Florida declined to prosecute a second time since the key witness at the original trial, David Falcon, was then dead and another witness for the prosecution had since recanted his testimony.

Melendez spent a total of 17 years, eight months and one day of incarceration before being released from the Union Correctional Institution on January 3, 2002. Upon release he received $100 compensation from the state. He has not received any further compensation, nor an official apology from the state of Florida.

Melendez now lives in New Mexico and also tours the world to tell his personal story and to discuss the issues surrounding the death penalty. He is also a member of the National Coalition to Abolish the Death Penalty and the Journey of Hope ... from violence to Healing.

== See also ==
- Capital punishment debate
- List of exonerated death row inmates
- List of wrongful convictions in the United States
- Wrongful conviction
