= Sabrina Butler =

American death row exoneree

Sabrina Butler (born 1971) is a Mississippi woman and former death row inmate who was acquitted at a retrial after being convicted as a teenager for the alleged murder and child abuse of her nine-month-old son, Walter Dean Butler.

== Background ==
At the time of Walter's death, Butler had two children. Butler had previously lost custody of her older child for abusing them. The jury was not informed of this.

== Death of baby ==
On April 11, 1989, 17-year-old Sabrina Butler rushed her nine-month-old son, Walter Dean Butler, to the hospital after he suddenly stopped breathing. Doctors had attempted to resuscitate the child for thirty minutes, but failed, and Sabrina's baby died the same day. Sabrina told the police and medical personnel that she had left her son with a babysitter named Ester Hollis. Sabrina said Hollis's son later told her that her son had stopped breathing. She then went to Hollis, who took 10 to 15 minutes to answer, after which she took her son to the hospital. The police then proceeded to the apartment complex where Sabrina lived to interview any potential witnesses, and to locate Ester Hollis. After a thorough check of other apartments, it was discovered that Ester Hollis did not exist and had been fabricated by Sabrina.

As a result of her lies, the police came to suspect that Sabrina had murdered her son. Sabrina was interviewed later at the morgue. Sabrina said she had lied out of fear and that everything was better now since she was going to be with her son.

Sabrina drew further suspicion after giving numerous conflicting statements to the police, including at least one version in which she admitted punching her son once in the stomach when he was crying.

== Trial ==
Sabrina's murder trial commenced on March 8, 1990. At the trial, prosecutors sought to prove that Sabrina's account of the events leading to her son's death were false, and that she had inflicted the fatal wounds intentionally. Sabrina did not testify at her trial. In 1990, she was convicted of capital murder and child abuse and sentenced to death. Sabrina became the only woman on Mississippi's death row.

== Appeal ==
Following her conviction, Sabrina filed an appeal with the Supreme Court of Mississippi on several bases. The courts reversed and remanded her convictions on August 26, 1992. The basis for the decision was that the prosecution had called out Sabrina's decision to not testify, thus violating her right to remain silent.

== Retrial ==
In 1995, Sabrina Butler's case went to retrial. By this time, more evidence emerged that Sabrina may have not murdered her son. At the trial, one of Sabrina's neighbors had come forward with evidence that corroborated her account: she attempted to administer CPR to her son. In addition, the medical examiner changed his opinion about Walter's cause of death, which he now believed occurred due to a kidney malady. However, no definitive cause of death was ever established.

One of Sabrina's appellate attorneys, Clive Stafford Smith, believed there had been a rush to judgment in the case, but conceded that he "doesn't know what the truth is." Her co-counsel, Robert McDuff, indicated that, at best, the case should have been prosecuted as manslaughter. He believed that Sabrina had been overcharged, causing the jury to distrust the prosecution's case.

On December 17, 1995, Sabrina was acquitted and released from custody. The jury foreperson indicated that they weren't fully convinced of Sabrina's innocence, but did have reasonable doubt.

== Today ==
When Sabrina was acquitted of murder, she had spent more than five years in prison and thirty-three months on death row. She is the first of two women in the United States to be exonerated from death row, the other being Debra Milke in Arizona.

Today, Sabrina is living in the same Mississippi town in which she was convicted, has remarried, and is raising three children. She is now hoping to be a criminal investigator.

Sabrina Butler-Porter had a book published in 2012, entitled Exonerated: The Sabrina Butler Story. She is also a storyteller in a collection of stories entitled Pruno, Ramen and a Side of Hope, Stories of Surviving Wrongful Conviction. In 2022, Elle magazine published her opinion essay about efforts to stop the execution of Melissa Lucio and summarizing claims raised by advocates that Lucio's conviction may be unreliable.

== See also ==
- List of women on death row in the United States
