= Joseph Burrows =

Joseph H. Burrows

Personal details
- Born: October 5, 1953
- Died: October 15, 2009 (aged 56) Homer, Illinois, U.S.

Joseph H. Burrows (October 5, 1953 – October 15, 2009) was an American man who was wrongfully convicted of the murder of farmer William E. Dulan at his home in Iroquois County, Illinois, in 1988. After his conviction and sentence to death in 1989, Burrows was held for nearly five years on death row.

Peter Rooney, a reporter for the Champaign-Urbana News-Gazette, obtained a recantation from a key witness against Burrows, and the case was reopened. Burrows' attorney, Kathleen Zellner, persuaded the real killer, Gayle Potter, to confess at the post-conviction hearing. Burrows was released in 1994.

== Chronology of events ==
On November 8, 1988, the body of 88-year-old farmer William E. Dulan was found at his home.

Gayle Potter, a cocaine addict, was picked up for forging a cheque of Dulan's. Her blood was found at the murder scene.

In a plea bargain, Potter admitted forging the cheque and taking part in the crime, but implicated two others. She claimed that Burrows, 32, had shot the older man, and also said that Ralph Frye, 22, a friend of Burrows who had slight cognitive disabilities, was involved. Potter and Frye were both sentenced to long prison terms, but Burrows was later sentenced to death. There was no physical evidence linking either Burrows or Frye to the crime. Four witnesses placed Burrows 60 miles away at the time of the crime.

== Conviction ==
Burrows' first trial for the 1988 first-degree murder of William Dulan ended in a hung jury. He was convicted in his second trial and sentenced to death on August 1, 1989. Burrows appealed his conviction and death sentence, but both were upheld in 1992 by the Supreme Court of Illinois.

== Exoneration ==
When learning that the Illinois Supreme Court turned down Burrows' appeal, Frye contacted a reporter and recanted his testimony against Burrows. He said he had been coerced by police into a false confession and testimony. At a post-conviction hearing, Kathleen Zellner persuaded the perpetrator Gayle Potter to confess to the murder. Burrows won a new trial, at which Potter and Frye both testified. The prosecution eventually dropped charges against Burrows, and he was released in 1994. After Burrow's exoneration, Gayle Potter and Ralph Frye were sentenced to 5 and 10 years in prison, respectively, for perjury for giving false testimony against him.

== Later life ==
Burrows was bitter over his wrongful conviction and years on death row. He filed a civil suit against the police, and was awarded $100,000. Years later, in 2005, he was convicted and sentenced to six years in prison for the possession of chemicals allegedly used in the production of methamphetamine. He was released in 2008 with day-for-day good time.

== Death ==
Burrows died at his home in Homer, Illinois, on October 15, 2009.

== See also ==
- List of exonerated death row inmates
- List of wrongful convictions in the United States
