= Anthony Charles Graves =

American exonerated death row inmate

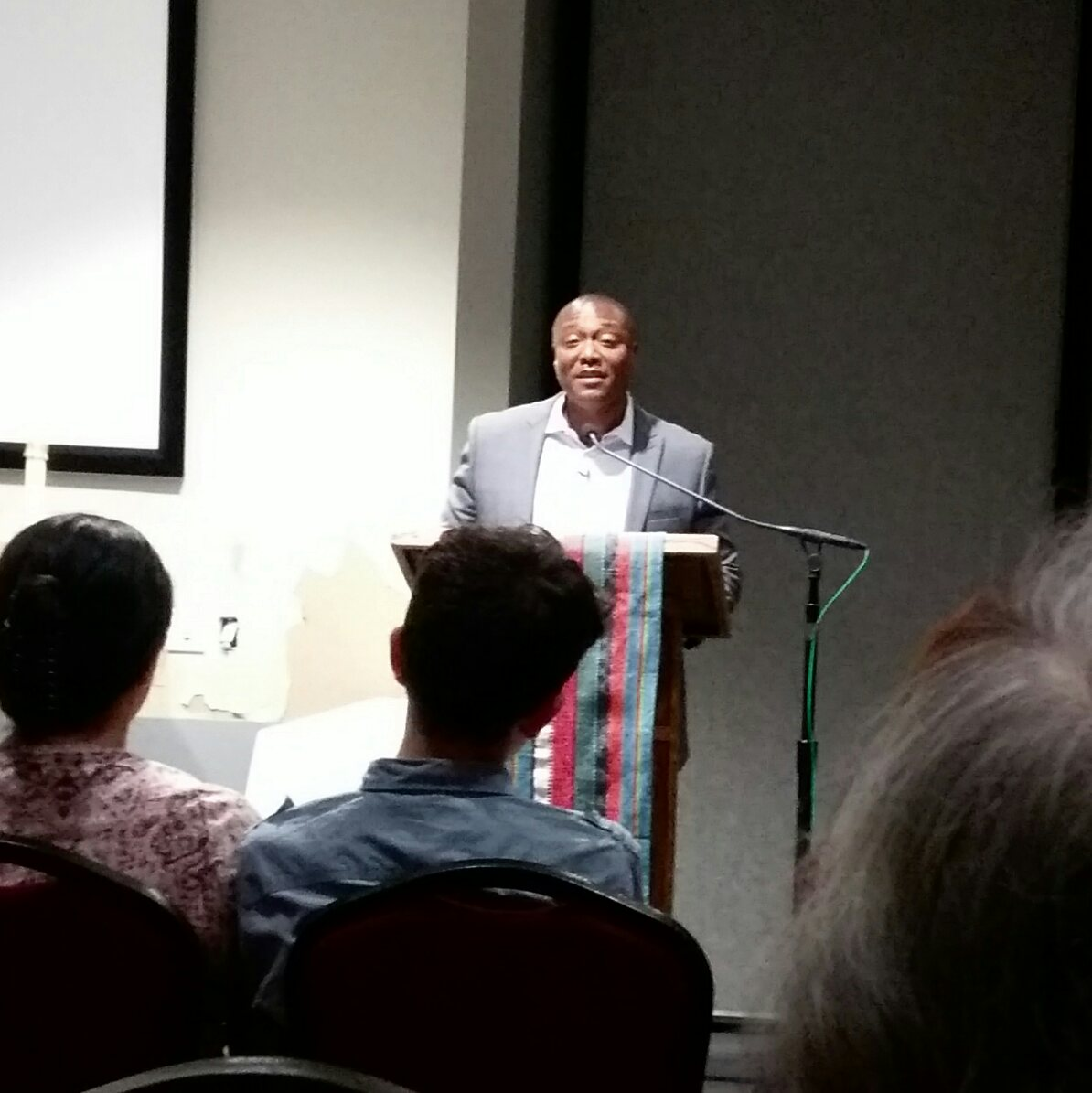
- Graves in 2017
- Born: August 29, 1965 (age 60); Brenham, Texas, US
- Known for: Wrongfully convicted and sentenced to death; later exonerated

Short video by Amnesty International

Anthony Charles Graves (born August 29, 1965) is the 138th exonerated death row inmate in America. With no record of violence, he was arrested at 26 years old, wrongfully convicted, and incarcerated for 18 years before finally being exonerated and released. He was awarded $1.4 million for the time he spent imprisoned, and the prosecutor who put him in prison, Charles Sebesta, was ultimately disbarred for concealing exculpatory evidence and using false testimony in the case.

== Biography ==
Graves grew up in Brenham and is the oldest among his four other siblings in his family. He is a father with three children. He worked at Magnetic Instruments in Brenham for three years before moving to Austin to work as an assembly line worker at Dell. In the spring before his arrest, Graves lost his job at Dell and returned to Brenham.

== Conviction ==
In 1992, Graves was charged with and convicted of murdering a family of six people in Somerville, Texas, despite the lack of a motive or any physical evidence connecting Graves to the crime scene. Instead of physical evidence, the conviction was based upon the testimony of Robert Earl Carter, who later admitted that he had committed the crime alone and was executed on May 31, 2000. Graves was twice scheduled for execution by lethal injection.

== Imprisonment ==
As a death row inmate, he entered the Texas Department of Criminal Justice (TDCJ) system on November 7, 1994. Male death row inmates convicted under Texas law were held at Ellis Unit in Walker County until 1999, when they were moved to the Terrell Unit (now Allan B Polunsky Unit) in Polk County. During his time in prison, he was held in solitary confinement.

Following Graves' exoneration and release, he testified at a Senate subcommittee hearing about the conditions of his imprisonment at Polunsky, and following his testimony, Mother Jones declared the prison to be the second-worst in the United States.

== Exoneration ==
After 12 years on death row, Graves' conviction was overturned by a federal appeals court in 2006, yet he was not released until four years later.

== Release ==
Following approval from district attorney Bill Parham, Graves was released from prison on October 27, 2010.

In June 2011, Graves was awarded $1.4 million for the time he spent on death row under the Tim Cole Compensation Act. Following this, the prosecutor who had sent Graves to prison, Charles Sebesta, was disbarred on June 11, 2015, for withholding exculpatory evidence in Graves' case and for using false testimony to secure the conviction.

In 2018, Graves published a memoir about his experience entitled Infinite Hope: The Story of One Man's Wrongful Conviction, Solitary Confinement, and Survival on Death Row.

== Philanthropy ==
Following his release, Graves founded a scholarship, the Nicole B. Cásarez Endowed Scholarship In Law, in honor of his attorney. Graves also founded The Peer Navigator Project, a charity supporting formerly incarcerated individuals as they transition out of prison.

== See also ==
- List of exonerated death row inmates
- List of wrongful convictions in the United States
- Wrongful execution
- Innocence Project of Texas
- Michael Roy Toney
