= Levon Jones =

American former death row inmate

Levon "Bo" Jones (born September 10, 1958) is an American former death row inmate.

== Conviction and release ==
Jones was convicted and sentenced to death in North Carolina in 1993 of first-degree murder for a fatal shooting which occurred in 1987.

The conviction was overturned by a federal judge in 2006 for inadequate defense from his attorney. While preparing for retrial, a key witness admitted to lying. Charges were subsequently dropped, and Jones was released from prison on May 2, 2008, after spending fifteen years on death row. Jones was the third person to be released from death row in the United States in 2008, after Kennedy Brewer and Glen Chapman, following an overturning of their convictions and the dropping of charges.

== See also ==
- List of exonerated death row inmates
