= Bill Wilson (convict) =

American farmer wrongfully convicted in Blount County, Alabama

Bill Wilson (born 1880) was an American farmer in Blount County, Alabama who was wrongfully convicted of murdering his wife and youngest child, both of whom were later found alive.

== Background ==
Bill Wilson, a farmer in Blount County, Alabama, married Jenny Wade in 1900. Their third child was born in 1907. Jenny left Wilson 19 months later with their third child to return to her family. Wilson then chose to move in with his father taking the two older children with him. During the divorce proceedings, Wade and the third child vanished. Shortly before Jenny was last seen, Jane McClendon, a local farmer's daughter, also mysteriously disappeared. For several weeks rumors circulated that foul play was involved in both disappearances.

In late 1912, Dolphus Tidwell and his son were fishing on the Black Warrior River near the property of Wilson's father when they noticed a bone sticking out of the soil. The Tidwells found a mat under the soil that exposed what they believed to be the skeletal remains of an adult and a child. Thinking that there may have been an Indigenous burial mound nearby, they searched the area for relics but found nothing. They re-buried the bones and returned home. News of the discovery spread, and for several days locals searched the area for Native American artifacts until they lost interest.

When no relics were found a farmhand named Jim House began speculating that the remains were not those of Indigenous people but his neighbor Jenny Wilson and her child. He recounted how he had seen Jenny visit her father-in-law's house carrying a basket in 1908 and that the following morning he noticed footprints leading to the river. Following the tracks, he found children's clothing and blood on a rock. The story soon spread until the information got back to the county prosecutor James Embry. Embry called a grand jury and indicted Bill Wilson for the murder of his wife and child.

== Trial ==
James Embry prosecuted the case before Judge J. E. Blackwood. In his opening remarks, he said that Jenny Wilson went to her father-in-law's house to visit her two older children in late November or early December 1908. Jenny and Bill Wilson had quarreled, which led to Wilson murdering his wife and child. Wilson then took the bodies to the bluff and burned them to destroy the evidence of his crime.

=== Prosecution evidence ===
Dolphus Tidwell testified that he found the bones that had been placed into evidence. These bones were speculated to remains of Jenny Wilson and her 19-month-old infant.

Dr. Marvin Denton testified for the state in regards to his findings from an examination of the bones. Although he agreed that the bones belonged to an adult and child, he noted that the child had permanent teeth. Permanent teeth typically do not appear until around the age of six. He also testified that he had never seen permanent teeth in a child under the age of four.

Jim House repeated his story about Jenny's visit to the Wilson farm, adding that he was concerned for her safety and had tried to talk her out of going. When he met Wilson the following day, House asked him about his wife and stated that Wilson denied that she visited the farm. It was after this encounter when House found the footprints and followed them to the spot where he found blood on a rock.

A convict who had a cell near Wilson, Mack Holcomb, testified that he overheard Wilson tell his eldest daughter Ruthie, "If you tell anything, I will tend to you when I get out." Seven-year-old Ruthie was cross-examined about this statement and stated that her father had said that if she was not a good girl, he would punish her when he got out of jail.

Several locals recounted conversations with Wilson where he showed animosity towards Jenny or made comments indicating she would not return.

=== Defense evidence ===
Lizzie McClendon, the mother of Jane McClendon, who had gone missing shortly before Jenny, told the jury that House had visited her after her daughter vanished and said that he would testify he saw the Wilsons kill her daughter if she would swear out a warrant for their arrest. Under cross-examination, House denied the claim but did admit to ill-feeling between himself and Bill Wilson.

Six witnesses, including Jenny's sister, swore that they had seen Jenny at various times in 1909 and that she was living with a man named John Wilson, who was unrelated to Bill Wilson. Mrs. Benton Cornelius testified that Jenny told her in April 1908 that she intended to move to Missouri after the separation.

Wilson's brother John, his sister Frances, his daughter Ruthie, and John Rice, who worked for Wilson, all denied that Jenny had visited the Wilson's home at any time after the separation.

Testimony was given that the female skeletal remains had no dental work even though Jenny had fillings in her two front teeth. Dr. J. F. Hancock said that he believed that the bones were at least ten years old, that the adult skeletal remains belonged to an elderly person, and that the child's permanent teeth excluded that skeleton from being that of a 19-month-old baby.

=== Verdict ===
On December 18, 1915, the jury found Bill Wilson guilty and convicted him of murder in the first degree. He was sentenced to life imprisonment, served at Alabama's Wetumpka State Penitentiary. An appeal was overturned, and several petitions for a pardon were also rejected.

== Pardon ==
In 1916, Dr. Aleš Hrdlička, curator of biological anthropology at the Smithsonian Institution, declared the bones to be parts of at least four or five individuals. The remains were very old, and there was nothing to indicate that they were not of Indigenous origin. The trial judge, J. E. Blackwood, believing that Wilson was innocent, pressured the governor and the Attorney-General unsuccessfully to commute the sentence. By this time, the public accepted Wilson's innocence, but prosecutor James Embry blocked all attempts to obtain a pardon.

In 1918, Wilson's former appeal lawyer located Jenny Wilson and her daughter, now aged 11, living in Vincennes, Indiana with her second husband. She returned to Blount County on July 8 and signed an affidavit giving a complete account of her movements from the time she disappeared until she was found. The same day the governor granted a full pardon, and Wilson was released.

== Aftermath ==
On February 15, 1919, the Alabama Legislature enacted a statute for the appointment of a commission to determine the amount of compensation Wilson would officially receive. It would be "up to the amount of $3,500" and equivalent to $63,500 in 2024, "for services rendered [to] the state while in prison," rather than compensation for wrongful imprisonment. An award for the maximum amount of $3,500 was entrusted to the state public trustee, a Blount County probate court judge. The probate court judge subsequently fled the state with the money. Wilson sued the judge's bondsman to recover the compensation due to an action that cost him $700 in legal fees ($12,700 in 2024). It is unknown how much he received, but it is believed to have been around $2,500 ($45,300 in 2024).

Wilson used the money to buy a small farm but got into debt and lost it. The last record of Wilson indicates that he was working as a day laborer digging coal in an Alabama mine.

== See also ==
- List of wrongful convictions in the United States
- Wilson v. State, 191 Ala, 7, 67 So. 1010 (1915).
- Bill of Exceptions, Circuit Court of Oneonta County, Alabama.
- General Acts of Alabama, 1919, p. 79.
- Report of the Board of Pardons of Alabama, October 1, 1917, p. 126.
