= Marietta Seven =

Exonerated defendants of 1971 murder charge

The Marietta Seven were defendants on a murder charge who were subsequently exonerated, having been convicted of the murder of Warren and Rosina Matthews in May 1971 in Marietta, Georgia.

== The murder ==
The victims - two physicians - were shot to death in their home, apparently during an attempted robbery.

== Trial and sentences ==
The principal evidence against them at the trial was the evidence of Deborah Ann Kidd, who testified she was one of the group, and that Creamer was the shooter. One, James Creamer, had been sentenced to death, and the others to life imprisonment. In 1974, Georgia State Supreme Court unanimously upheld all the convictions and sentences.

== Post-trial emergence of contrary evidence ==
In 1975, it emerged from an investigation by the Atlanta Constitution newspaper that Kidd's testimony was probably false. She said she was under the influence of drugs when the crime had occurred and remembered little of it, and her full account was recovered with the aid of an hypnotist. Although the tapes of the hypnosis session showed that the hypnotist had suggested the incriminating material to which Kidd confessed, and one woman she named as participating in the crime was proven to be out of state at the time, the defense was not given transcripts of the sessions nor informed about her false identification. Kidd had also given many incompatible versions of events that transpired at the crime scene, which the defense team did not receive. It was later discovered that Kidd was romantically involved with one of the detectives assigned to the case.

== Appeal and reversal ==
During the course of appeals, Kidd admitted she lied in her original testimony, and Billy Birt, a death-row inmate, confessed that he and two other men had committed the murder. In 1975, the convictions of the seven were reversed and the state dropped the charges.

== See also ==
- List of exonerated death row inmates
- List of wrongful convictions in the United States
- List of United States death row inmates
