= Wrongful conviction of Robert Jones =

American exoneree wrongfully convicted for rape and manslaughter

Robert Jones
- Born: January 26, 1973 (age 52); New Orleans, Louisiana, U.S.

Robert Jones (born January 26, 1973) is an American man who was wrongfully convicted for rape and manslaughter, following the murder of British tourist Julie Stott in New Orleans in 1992. He served 23 years of a life sentence before being released from Louisiana State Penitentiary after his conviction was overturned by the Louisiana Fourth Circuit Court of Appeal. After the Louisiana Supreme Court dismissed the state's appeal, New Orleans District Attorney Leon Cannizzaro claimed that the state had planned to retry Jones on the same charges. However, as Jones was preparing for a pretrial hearing that his attorneys said would highlight prosecutorial misconduct in the case, the DA's office dropped all of the charges against him.

As of January 2018, Jones was working for the Orleans Public Defender as a client advocate. Jones co-authored the book Unbreakable Resolve: Triumphant Stories of 3 True Gentlemen, which offers an accounting of his time before, during, and after prison. He also co-founded a non-profit youth mentoring organization, the Free-Dem Foundation.
