= Anthony Porter =

American former death row inmate

Anthony Porter (December 14, 1954 – July 5, 2021) was a Chicago resident convicted and sentenced to death in 1983 for the murder of two teenagers on the South Side of the city. He served 16 years on death row before he was exonerated in 1999 after new evidence was uncovered by Northwestern University professors and students from the Medill School of Journalism as part of their investigation for the school's Innocence Project. Porter had already made multiple appeals that were rejected, including by the US Supreme Court, and he was once 50 hours away from execution when another suspect was identified and confessed, in a process now considered highly controversial.

In 1999 the Medill Innocence Project identified Alstory Simon as the perpetrator of the murders. Simon, who was living in Chicago in the 1980s but had since returned to Milwaukee, confessed to the crime on videotape. After pleading guilty, Simon was convicted in 1999, and sentenced to 37 1/2 years in prison. Simon later recanted his confession, saying that the confession was coerced by private investigator Paul Ciolino, who posed as a city police officer while working with the Innocence Project. David Protess, one of two professors involved with the Innocence Project, was suspended by Northwestern University in 2011 as a result of the controversy. Both witnesses against Simon, one of whom was discovered to be a paid actor who was never even at the scene, made videotaped recantations.

After a yearlong investigation, the charges against Simon were vacated by the Cook County State's Attorney's office and he was freed in 2014, after having served 15 years in prison. The Chicago double-murder case is still unsolved.

Anthony Porter filed a civil suit against the city, but a jury trial in 2005 found in favor of the city, the original police investigation, and prosecution. Alstory Simon filed suit in 2015 against Northwestern University's Innocence Project, and was awarded an undisclosed settlement in June 2018.

The 2014 documentary A Murder in the Park argued that Porter, who had been identified as the murderer by six eyewitnesses, was guilty, Alstory Simon was innocent and had been framed by Professor David Protess and his team from Northwestern University, who were more focused on undermining capital punishment in Illinois than learning the actual truth about the murders.

Less than two months after his release, Porter was charged with assaulting his teenage daughter and her mother. In 2011, Porter was sentenced to a year in jail for retail theft. He died of an opioid overdose on July 5, 2021.

== The crime ==
About 1 a.m. on August 15, 1982, two teenagers, Marilyn Green and her fiance Jerry Hillard, were shot and killed near a swimming pool in Washington Park on the south side of Chicago.

Anthony Porter, a 27-year-old gang member, was identified by several witnesses as being involved with the crime or near the crime scene. William Taylor, who had been swimming in the pool at the time of the shooting, initially said that he had not seen the shooting but had seen Porter run past shortly after the shots. He later said that he had seen Porter firing the shots. He was among six witnesses who identified Porter in the areas of the shooting, including one who said he had been robbed by Porter at gunpoint a short time earlier in the park.

Police were given leads pointing toward other suspects. They appeared to pursue only Porter. Upon hearing that he was under suspicion, Porter went to the police and turned himself in. He was immediately arrested and charged with the two murders, one count of armed robbery, one count of unlawful restraint, and two counts of unlawful use of weapons.

After a short trial, Porter was convicted of the murders. Judge Robert L. Sklodowski sentenced Porter to death, calling him a "perverse shark". An appeal to the Illinois Supreme Court was denied in February 1986, and an appeal to the United States Supreme Court was denied the following year. Porter continued to file appeals in the years that followed, delaying the execution.

In 1995 Porter's defense counsel arranged testing of his client's mental capacity. He was found to have an IQ of 51, characterizing him as intellectually disabled. His counsel filed a new appeal on the grounds that Porter was incapable of understanding his punishment by the death penalty. In late 1998, forty-eight hours before he was scheduled to be executed, the court granted another stay.

== Northwestern University investigation ==
At that time, students in a journalism course taught by Northwestern University professor David Protess investigated the Anthony Porter case as part of a class assignment for the Innocence Project of the Medill School of Journalism (it is now called the Medill Justice Project.) The students assigned to the Porter case gathered evidence through their investigation that exposed serious flaws in the prosecution.

Student Tom McCann and Private Investigator Paul J. Ciolino spoke to William Taylor who, in December 1998, recanted his original statements. He said that Chicago police had "threatened, harassed and intimidated" him into accusing Porter. But McCann and Ciolino did not speak to any other of the original six witnesses, nor to the detectives who investigated the case.

On January 29, 1999, Inez Jackson, the estranged wife of Alstory Simon, then living in Milwaukee, Wisconsin, where he was from, came forward to testify against him. He had lived in Chicago in the 1980s. She claimed that she had been with Simon when he killed Hilliard in retaliation for "skimming money from drug deals". She also said that she had never met or seen Porter. Her nephew Walter Jackson, whose apartment Simon allegedly fled to after the shooting, corroborated her story.

Simon was contacted at his home in Milwaukee by Ciolino and others associated with the Innocence Project. Four days later, on February 3, 1999, Simon went to the police and confessed to the crime in a videotaped session. Protess and the students introduced information from their investigation.

After representatives of the Cook County State's Attorney office saw Simon's tape, it launched a new investigation into the Porter case.

Two days later, Porter was released from prison on bail, after having spent 17 years on death row. The state dropped the charges against him the next month.

In 1999 Alstory Simon was formally charged with the two murders. In September 1999, Simon pleaded guilty to two counts of second-degree murder and was sentenced to 37 1/2 years in prison.

== Recantation ==
In 2005, Inez Jackson and her nephew, Walter Jackson, both recanted their statements that implicated Simon in the crime. Inez Jackson was extremely ill and on her deathbed. They admitted that they had fabricated their stories in order to obtain money and help from professor David Protess in order to free Inez's son, Sonny Jackson, and her nephew, Walter Jackson, from prison. When Walter Jackson had first become involved in the case, he was incarcerated for first-degree murder.

Alstory Simon recanted his confession. He said that he had been pressured into making a false statement by Ciolino and another man. They posed as city police officers, and they showed him a videotape of an actor pretending to be a witness who implicated him in the crime. They promised him a short prison sentence and a movie deal if he confessed.

Protess and Ciolino vigorously denied any wrongdoing; they said that a number of Simon's claims are false, and they believed that he was guilty of the murders. In 2011, Northwestern University placed Protess on leave after finding that he had deliberately falsified evidence related to a subpoena issued by Cook County for his records in a different wrongful conviction case. He resigned from the university and by 2014 had become head of the Chicago Innocence Project.

Cook County State's Attorney Anita Alvarez conducted a year-long investigation of Simon's case. She vacated the charges against him and ended his 37-year sentence in October 2014, ordering his release from prison. He had served for 15 years. The question of who committed the double murders is unanswered. Alvarez said the investigation by the Medill Innocence Project "involved a series of alarming tactics that were not only coercive and absolutely unacceptable by law enforcement standards, they were potentially in violation of Mr. Simon's constitutionally protected rights."

== Civil cases ==
After his release, in 2003 Anthony Porter sued the City of Chicago for $24 million. The City refused settlement and the case went to trial in 2005. After additional investigation, the City's attorney argued that Porter had in fact committed the killings. The jury found in favor of the City, thus the City was not liable for any damages, and Porter did not receive any settlement.

Based on information revealed in Porter's suit, which detailed the work of the Innocence Project in gaining new material, Alstory Simon filed a post-conviction petition for relief January 2006 in his case. He noted that Ciolino and others had deceived him when they contacted him, including having an actor pretend to be a witness against him in the case. Furthermore, Ciolino had recommended a defense counsel who was a professional colleague and associate, in a clear conflict of interest. As a result, Simon said he was denied due process and did not have adequate defense counsel.

After Simon was finally exonerated, in 2014 he filed a civil federal civil rights suit against the Northwestern University Innocence Project, saying people associated with it had deceived and coerced him into a false confession to the murders of Hilliard and Green, which resulted in his being convicted of murder and serving 15 years in prison. In November 2018, he received an undisclosed settlement.

== Ramifications ==
State officials initially denied any wrongdoing in the Porter case. Chicago's Mayor Richard M. Daley, who had been Illinois State Attorney during the prosecution of Porter, asserted that "It was a thorough case, it was reviewed. No one railroads anyone." Illinois Governor George Ryan suggested that the exoneration of Porter was evidence that the system worked.

The Northwestern University Innocence Project had earlier assisted in the exoneration of four men on death row. More recently, Rolando Cruz and Alejandro Hernandez were found to have been wrongfully convicted after having been prosecuted by Illinois Attorney General Jim Ryan for the 1983 rape and murder of 10-year-old Jeanine Nicarico. They were exonerated after having been sentenced to death.

Given these cases, in which several innocent men were found to have been wrongfully convicted and sentenced to death, there was intense pressure from the public and the media to make a change. After ordering a review of the state's cases, in 2000 Governor Ryan initiated a moratorium on executions in Illinois. In 2011 the state legislature passed a law abolishing use of the death penalty in the state and Governor Pat Quinn signed it into law.

== Representation in other media ==
- The documentary A Murder in the Park (2014) explored the campaign to free Anthony Porter. It concluded that the original conviction of Porter was sound, and that Alstory Simon was wrongfully convicted. The film argues that David Protess and his team conducted a partial and imperfect investigation of the Porter conviction. It suggests they were more concerned with undermining Illinois' use of the death penalty than with finding the truth of the murders.

== See also ==
- List of exonerated death row inmates
- List of wrongful convictions in the United States
- Illinois Innocence Project
