= Prosecution of Rodricus Crawford =

Rodricus Crawford
- Born: 1988 (age 37–38)
- Parent: Mother: Abigail Crawford
- Status: Charges dismissed
- Criminal charges: Murder
- Penalty: Death; Exonerated

Details
- Victims: None, charges were dismissed
- Country: United States
- State: Louisiana
- Locations: 6800 block of Broadway, Shreveport
- Imprisoned at: Louisiana State Penitentiary; Free man

The prosecution of Rodricus Crawford in Caddo Parish, Louisiana in 2013, attracted national media attention. Crawford, a black man, was convicted and sentenced to death that year for allegedly suffocating his one-year-old son. His death sentence was seen as part of a pattern in the parish, which has the highest rate of death penalty sentencing in the nation. The prosecutor in this case said this penalty was needed for society's revenge.

The conviction greatly depended upon the findings of a disputed pathology report. After sentencing, Crawford was held on death row, the second-youngest man there. He was imprisoned at Louisiana State Penitentiary, commonly called Angola. New medical evidence introduced in 2014 on appeal of the case disputed the findings of the prosecution witnesses.

In 2016, the conviction was overturned by the Louisiana Supreme Court on appeal, due to findings of prosecution misconduct in jury selection. In April 2017, the Caddo Parish District Attorney's Office dismissed all charges against Crawford; he was exonerated.

== Families ==
At age 23, Crawford had been living with his mother, brother, sister, grandmother, and uncle, in Mooretown, a neighborhood in Shreveport. The mother of his son is Lakendra Lott, a close friend whom Crawford had known since childhood. Both of them also have daughters from other relationships. Lott lived with her family several houses away.

== Case ==
Crawford claimed his one-year-old son Roderius Lott had been sleeping next to him, and was unresponsive when Crawford awoke in the morning. When police arrived, they asked about a bruise on the infant's lip. Crawford said that his son had fallen in the bathroom the day before. Crawford denied that he had accidentally slept on top of his son.

That same day, James Traylor, a police pathologist, determined that the bruise on the infant's lip indicated smothering, and other bruises indicated child abuse. During the autopsy Traylor also noticed signs of pneumonia in the infant's lungs and that he had sepsis, but did not consider it serious enough to cause death. Based upon Traylor's conclusions, chief assistant district attorney Dale Cox charged Crawford with homicide, and asked for the death penalty. The scientific validity of Traylor's conclusions was questioned before, during, and after the trial.

== Conflicting pathology reports ==
Dr. James Traylor, Jr., a pathologist from the University Health Center at Louisiana State University, performed the autopsy. He acknowledged that the autopsy revealed that the infant had sepsis, which can be fatal, and bilateral bronchial pneumonia, but said this was not sufficient to cause death. He claimed that bruises were a result of abuse and the infant Roderius was smothered. The Caddo Parish Coroner, Dr. Thoma, also "said the boy's broncho-pneumonia 'was not significant enough to have killed the child' and had nothing to do with his death."

"Traylor said that his finding of suffocation was based entirely on the bruises on Roderius's lips, but he never sampled the tissue to date the injury, a basic test that would have revealed whether the bruises came from the earlier fall in the bathroom, an explanation that he ignored. He misstated medical science, telling the jury that Roderius's brain had swelled as a result of suffocation. Swelling does not occur in cases of smothering, because the person dies rapidly, and the brain cannot swell if blood has stopped circulating. The brain can swell, though, in cases of pneumonia with sepsis."

Pathologist Daniel Spitz testified for the defense. He had co-authored a pathology text book with his father Werner Spitz, which is widely used in medical schools. Daniel Spitz determined the infant died from pneumonia and testified to that conclusion. Prosecutor Dale Cox tried to discredit Spitz by questioning him about a mistake the pathologist had once made in another case.

Since the trial, several other pathologists have questioned the scientific validity of the original pathologist's conclusion that the infant died from suffocation. The prosecution's case appeared to depend almost entirely on interpretation of complex pathology data. Four experts testified at the 2016 Louisiana Supreme Court appeals hearing that the infant had died of pneumonia, which contributed to the overturning of Crawford's conviction.

== Trial and conviction ==
Before the trial started in Shreveport, Prosecutor Dale Cox used five of seven peremptory challenges to dismiss black jurors from the jury. Crawford was tried in and found guilty in November 2013. During the penalty phase of the trial, the defense called character witnesses, including his mother and brother, who testified that he was a loving, responsible father. During cross examination, the prosecution brought up the facts that Crawford had dropped out of high school, had no job, and smoked marijuana, which was illegal. The same facts are characteristic of many of the other residents of his neighborhood.

The prosecutor made a lengthy argument during the penalty phase, quoting the Bible and claiming that it supported the death penalty. The jury voted for the death penalty. The defense moved for a new trial, based on Cox's having "misquoted and misinterpreted biblical authority in the argument that Jesus would punish one who harms a child with the death penalty and thus violated Crawford's right to a fair trial." They had affidavits from three theologians about correct interpretation of the passage. The motion was denied by the trial judge.

Shreveport is the parish seat for Caddo Parish, where juries have sentenced more persons to death than in any other county/parish in the United States. Prosecutor Dale Cox, who won more than a third of death sentences in the parish in the previous five years, has said, "I'm a believer that the death penalty serves society's interest in revenge." Cox sent a letter to Crawford's probation officer, stating, "I am sorry that Louisiana has adopted lethal injection as the form of implementing the death penalty. Mr. Crawford deserves as much physical suffering as it is humanly possible to endure before he dies."

As Crawford's attorney Daryl Gold expected, his first appeal for a writ of certiorari from the Louisiana Supreme Court was denied on November 14, 2014, as the court seldom overturns convictions. The brief discussed statistics and the "racial and geographic arbitrariness of the death penalty in Louisiana—confined predominantly to African-American men prosecuted in Caddo Parish"—and said that "Crawford's fate depended far more on where he was prosecuted than his ultimate moral culpability."

== Appeal and release ==
In 2014, while the case was on appeal before the Louisiana Supreme Court, the defense introduced new medical evidence, "affidavits from a pediatric neuropathologist, a pediatric neurologist, and an expert in pediatric infectious diseases, all of which said that Roderius was the victim of bronchopneumonia." There was additional evidence related to interpretation of the condition of the brain and bruises. The defense requested that the case be remanded to the trial court for a hearing, which the court denied on March 16, 2015.

But in November 2016, Crawford's conviction was overturned by the Court. They found that Prosecutor Cox may have discriminated against black jurors during jury selection, and the trial judge had erred by not responding to the defense motion on this issue. The court further expressed surprise that Crawford had been prosecuted at all, given that the autopsy showed the infant had sepsis and bronchio-pneumonia and there was no evidence that Crawford had a history of abusing his son. It ordered Crawford released on bond, pending a new trial or other action by the District Attorney's Office.

== Exoneration ==
Crawford was released on bond, and his case was re-evaluated by a new district attorney. Dale Cox had decided against running for re-election in 2015, and resigned from the district attorney's office that year. On April 17, 2017, the Caddo Parish District Attorney's Office formally dismissed all charges against Mr. Crawford. It said it "could not meet the burden of proof to gain a new conviction for Mr. Crawford."

In November 2017, Crawford filed a federal lawsuit against police and others, including several parties including the Caddo Parish Coroner's Office, the Caddo Parish District Attorney's Office, and the Shreveport Fire Department.
