= Gregory Bright =

American prisoner

Gregory Bright (born 1954) is an American man from New Orleans, who was convicted of second degree murder in 1974 at the age of 20. He was sentenced to life imprisonment without parole, served at the Louisiana State Penitentiary. After several years of appeals, Bright was granted a new trial in 2001 on the grounds that the prosecution had withheld evidence from the defense in his previous trial. On June 24, 2003, Bright and Earl Truvia were released after the Orleans Parish district attorney dismissed all charges against them; they had spent 27 1/2 years in prison for a crime they did not commit. When Bright was released from prison, the State of Louisiana provided him with only a US $10 check and garbage bags full of legal paperwork.

Bright speaks around the United States about his wrongful incarceration and his life since being released from prison. He can also be seen on HBO's Tremé, the third season of FX's American Horror Story and TNT's Memphis Beat.

== Innocence Project New Orleans ==
In 2010, Bright joined Innocence Project New Orleans as Assistant Education and Outreach Director.

== Never Fight a Shark in Water ==
Lara Naughton and Gregory Bright collaborated on a documentary play based on Bright's words and recollections that exposes the failure of the criminal justice system, life in prison, and Bright's journey to freedom and forgiveness. With its first showing in 2010, the play is now performed by Bright himself under Naughton's direction.

== Acting career ==
Since being released from prison, Bright has acted in several film and TV roles.

=== FIlm ===
Year	Title	Role	Notes	Ref(s)
2013	Twelve Years a Slave	Edward		
2019	Synchronic	Priest		

=== Television ===
Year	Title	Role	Notes	Ref(s)
2010	Treme		3 episodes	
2010	Memphis Beat	Pee-Wee		
2013	American Horror Story	Homeless man		
2013	Roots	Driver slave		

== See also ==
- List of wrongful convictions in the United States
