= Mark Maxson =

American convict exonerated in 2016 by DNA evidence

Mark Maxson is a formerly imprisoned convict, who was falsely accused and convicted of the murder of Lindsay Murdock, a six-year-old boy, and later exonerated by DNA evidence. Following the murder in August 1993, Maxson spent over two decades in prison before being released in September 2016.

== Murder and trial ==
On August 29, 1993, the badly beaten body of six-year-old Lindsay Murdoch was found on South State Street, in Chicago. Maxson had mentioned to a TV reporter that he had bought a packet of potato chips for the boy on August 28 and told him to go home. The police picked up Maxson and, according to Maxson, he was beaten and tortured until he signed a confession (the State of Illinois Torture Inquiry and Relief Commission found in 2013 that Maxson's accusations were credible). Maxson refused to sign and withdrew his confession. Fingerprints on a piece of broken glass, blood on the boys shirt and a pubic hair found at the crime scene did not match Maxson. Despite the lack of physical evidence linking him to the crime, Maxson was convicted of the murder and sentenced to life in jail plus 50 years by Judge Daniel Locallo, who said of Maxson, "You are a man of malignant heart and I find you must be eliminated from society."

== Exoneration ==
The Cook County, Illinois Conviction Integrity Unit got the Illinois state's attorney's office to agree to DNA testing of the evidence in 2015. The DNA on Lindsay Murdoch's shirt and pants matched another man, Osborne Wade (who had been convicted of stabbing another man to death in 1974), but not Maxson. In May 2016, Wade admitted in a confession that he had killed Lindsay Murdoch. On September 27, 2016, a Cook County judge threw out Maxson's conviction and he was released from jail.

This case was the fifteenth conviction that the Cook County, Illinois Conviction Integrity Unit overturned since the unit was set up in 2012.

== See also ==
- List of wrongful convictions in the United States
