= A Murder in the Park =

- Directed by: Shawn Rech and Brandon Kimber
- Written by: Brandon Kimber
- Edited by: Brandon Kimber
- Release date: 2014
- Running time: 91 minutes
- Country: United States
- Language: English

A Murder in the Park is a 2014 American true crime documentary directed by Shawn Rech and Brandon Kimber.

The documentary examines the controversial conviction of Alstory Simon, who served 15+ years in an Illinois prison for double homicide following a false confession, which in 1999 freed a man already convicted of the killings.

== Synopsis ==
In 1982, Jerry Hillard and Marilyn Green were murdered in Chicago's Washington Park. Anthony Porter was found guilty of the murders and sentenced to death in 1983. In 1998, just hours before his scheduled execution and after serving 17 years in prison, Anthony Porter's execution was stayed by the Illinois Supreme Court out of concern for Porter's low IQ. Subsequently, led by David Protess, professor and founder of Northwestern University's Medill Innocence Project, a group of undergraduate journalism students executed a re-investigation of Porter's case. They conducted a series of experiments to prove that Porter could not have been the killer.

The students claimed to have found the real killer, and through their efforts, Anthony Porter was released from prison and became the face of the anti-death penalty movement. They suspected another individual of committing the crime – Alstory Simon – whose ex-wife had claimed she was with Simon when he committed the murders. Members of the Medill Innocence Project, with the help of private investigator Paul Ciolino, came to Simon's apartment and told him the Chicago police were on their way to arrest him, and showed Simon a video of someone (later found to be an actor) saying they knew that he committed the murders. Allegedly through coercion, they produced a taped confession of Simon admitting to the murders.

Alstory Simon was convicted and sentenced to 37 1/2 years in prison. His defense attorney, Jack Rimland, was a friend and colleague of Paul Ciolino, and encouraged Simon to accept a plea deal despite his innocence. Simon later recanted his confession. The intervention by Rimland was cited by prosecutor Anita Alvarez to vacate Simon's sentence. It was not until October 2013, and due in part to the investigation conducted for A Murder in the Park, that the Cook County State's Attorney's office reopened the case. Simon was freed in October 2014 after serving more than 15 years in prison. The documentary addresses many questionable actions by members of the Medill Innocence Project, including the possibility that they neglected to interview eyewitnesses from Anthony Porter's original case, and instead relied on their own findings and experiments. Additionally, Alstory Simon's ex-wife later recanted her statement that she had been with Simon during the murders.

== Reception/Follow Up ==
A Murder in the Park made its world premiere at the DOC NYC Festival in New York City in 2014. A Murder in the Park was screened theatrically to a positive reception, then aired on Showtime/The Movie Channel, followed by a run on Netflix.

A Murder in the Park was selected for Time magazine's list of “15 of the Most Fascinating True Crime Stories Ever Told” in 2016. The film also has a 76% fresh rating on Rotten Tomatoes.

Simon filed a $40 million lawsuit against Northwestern University, David Protess, and Paul Ciolino in 2015. In 2018, the case resulted in a confidential settlement. Ciolino sued various parties who appeared in the film, claiming defamation of character. The suit was dismissed but an appeal is pending.

The state of Illinois abolished the death penalty in 2011. This followed the conviction and subsequent release of Anthony Porter, an action that “reignited” debate in Illinois about capital punishment.
