= Michael Roy Toney =

- Born: December 29, 1965; Cottonwood, California, U.S.
- Died: October 3, 2009 (aged 43); Rusk, Texas, U.S.

Michael Roy Toney (December 29, 1965 – October 3, 2009) was charged and wrongfully convicted in 1999 for a bombing that killed three people and injured two others in Lake Worth, Texas, in 1985. Toney was sentenced to death and spent ten years on death row. On December 17, 2008, Toney's conviction was vacated by the Texas Court of Criminal Appeals because of prosecutorial misconduct. Toney was released from custody in September 2009 and died in a car accident about a month later.

== Early life ==
Toney grew up in Cottonwood, California, a small town in Shasta County about 90 miles (140 km) north of Sacramento. His father left the family early in his life, and his mother worked in local taverns. She would bring home a number of men who would beat her and her sons. To escape from this, Toney would often retreat to a shed. When Toney was 9 or 10 years old, one of her boyfriends strapped him to a chair, duct-taped his wrists down and set fire to his hands. When he was 15, another one of his mother's boyfriends attacked him with a fishing gaff and gouged a huge hole in his hip. He quit school before the 10th grade and left for Texas, settling down in Hurst-Euless, in the Bedford area of Tarrant County. He married a woman named Kim when he was 38 years old.

== Case ==
On the evening of Thanksgiving Day, November 28, 1985, in the Hilltop Mobile Home Park between Lake Worth and Azle, Texas, several members of the Blount family were celebrating the holiday together in the Blounts' trailer. The family included Joe Blount, a 44-year-old skilled mechanic; his wife Susan; their 15-year-old daughter Angela; their son Robert; Joe's brother Carl; and Michael Columbus, Carl's son.

After the family ate Thanksgiving dinner, Carl Blount went home around 5:00 p.m. Around 9:00 p.m., Susan Blount went to lie down for a nap. Joe Blount drove Robert, Angela and Michael to a convenience store about half a mile away from the park where they bought snacks and beer. Susan soon heard a knock at the front door. She looked out the window but did not see anybody, so she returned to her nap. When the rest of family returned from the convenience store, they discovered a briefcase on the doorstep. The three teenagers were excited because they thought that the briefcase might have either money or jewels in it. After bringing the briefcase inside, Angela opened the latches and it exploded. Joe, Angela, and Michael were killed when a bomb in the briefcase exploded.

== Conviction ==
In June 1997, Toney was in jail awaiting a hearing for a burglary that happened in 1993. Here he was talking to Charles "Jack" Ferris in Parker County Jail in Weatherford, Texas. The two men began talking about the bombing. Ferris was then released from jail by telling the Parker County authorities that Toney had confessed to him. After Ferris told the authorities, the investigators questioned Toney's ex-wife. In the beginning, Ms. Toney told prosecutors, "Michael killing people in a bombing? You're nuts." But Ms. Toney decided to do some research on the case. When she realized what had taken place, she called federal agents and told her story. Soon after, Toney was indicted for capital murder.

Months passed, and Ferris changed his story about Toney's alleged confession to the crime. Ferris explained how Toney had come up with the story in order to get him out of jail earlier. He told investigators that "Toney and me made up the entire thing."

== Trial ==
The trial started in May 1999, in Fort Worth, Texas. Susan and Robert Blount gave their testimony as to what happened that day. Then the testimony from his ex-wife, his ex-best friend and another cellmate occurred. His ex-wife said that she, Toney and his best friend Chris Meeks went to a propane shop that was adjacent to the Hilltop Mobile Home Park. She says that Toney got out of the truck with a briefcase and disappeared. She then said he returned without the briefcase and they then went to the Nature Center and stayed for several hours. Her testimony also included that Toney shot a beaver with a rifle while they were at the Nature Center.

A cellmate of Michael Toney, Finis Blankenship, testified that Toney told him that he was paid $5,000 for the murders. Blankenship also said that the murders were part of a drug-related hit, but the bomb was put on the wrong doorstep. His testimony came in the second phase of the trial. This helped the jury decide whether Toney deserved to be executed. This testimony showed the jury that Toney had a motive for the crime. At the time, Blankenship was facing two counts of indecency with a child and habitual-criminal charges, so he says that he agreed to testify against Toney in exchange for having the charges dropped. Blankenship now says that his testimony was a lie. Chris Meeks' testimony didn't coincide with all of Ms. Toney's testimony. Meeks changed his story four times. At first he told investigators that he knew nothing about the bombing as well as the grand jury. He also failed a polygraph test. In 2001, he signed an affidavit taking back the things he said during his testimony. He said, "My testimony about the events that happened on Thanksgiving day, 1985, may not have happened on that day."

Toney said that he did not hear about the crime until 1997. He said that he had never been to the Hilltop Mobile Home Park and that he didn't he even know it existed until just prior to his trial. Ms. Toney and Mr. Meeks said that Toney was driving a truck on the night of the bombing. However, Toney said that he didn't buy the truck until December 13, 1985, a month after the incident.

== Conviction overturned ==
The Tarrant County District Attorney's Office had withheld 14 pieces of evidence that were key to his defense. After this, Tarrant County prosecutors turned the case over to the Attorney General of Texas. The State of Texas subsequently dropped all charges against him and he was released on September 2, 2009. He died in an auto accident near Rusk, Texas, on October 3, 2009.

== See also ==
- List of exonerated death row inmates
- List of wrongful convictions in the United States
- List of United States death row inmates
