= Hubert Nathan Myers and Clifford Williams =

Two African American men wrongfully convicted of murder

Hubert Nathan Myers and Clifford Williams are two African American men who were served 42 years in prison after being wrongfully convicted of first degree murder and attempted murder due to eyewitness misidentification, ineffective assistance of counsel and official misconduct. They are the first exonerees freed based on an investigation by a Conviction Integrity Unit in Florida.

== Conviction ==
They were convicted only on the testimony of one of the victims Nina Marshall, who was shot alongside Jeanette Williams who was killed.

== Exoneration ==
Both men were exonerated after 42 years due to eyewitness misidentification, ineffective assistance of counsel and official misconduct. They are the first exonerees freed based on an investigation by a Conviction Integrity Unit in Florida.

== Compensation for wrongful conviction ==
Only Hubert Nathan Myers is eligible for compensation for wrongful conviction due to Florida's "Clean Hands Provision" which only allows compensation if a person is "not convicted of another violent felony or more than one non-violent felonies."
