= Debra Milke =

Woman accused of murder (born 1964)

- Born: Debra Jean Sadeik; March 10, 1964 (age 62); West Berlin, West Germany
- Known for: Conviction for son's murder; former Arizona death row inmate

Debra Jean Milke (née Sadeik; born March 10, 1964) is a German-American woman who spent over 25 years in prison in the state of Arizona. She was one of three people sentenced to death for the December 2, 1989, shooting death of her four-year-old son, Christopher Conan Milke. Her alleged conspirators were her boyfriend James Lynn Styers and his friend Roger Mark Scott. Neither testified against her and both agreed that she was not present at the shooting. Scott implicated Milke as the mastermind while Styers said she had no involvement whatsoever. They implicated each other as the actual shooter. Who that was remains a subject of speculation.

With the passage of time Milke's conviction became increasingly polarizing, largely due to the conduct and testimony of Phoenix police detective Armando Saldate Jr. Saldate testified that Milke confessed to him. The alleged confession was uncorroborated, however, and Milke is adamant it did not occur. Saldate was later accused of perjury. Questions about whether a confession was made and whether Milke had voluntarily waived her Miranda rights, Saldate's long history of misconduct, and prosecuting attorney Noel Levy withholding Saldate's personnel record from the defense, became central issues of Milke's appeals.

In March 2013, a three-judge panel of the United States Ninth Circuit Court unanimously overturned Debra Milke's conviction. In their ruling, the judges excoriated the conviction. Milke was released on $250,000 bond that September by Judge Rosa P. Mroz of the Maricopa County Superior Court. County prosecutor Bill Montgomery unsuccessfully appealed the decision to the state supreme court, which blocked a proposed retrial. On March 23, 2015, all charges against Debra Milke were formally dismissed with prejudice by Judge Mroz.

In 2020, Milke lost a civil suit claiming wrongful conviction. A federal judge found that Milke had tampered with evidence in the case at least 16 times. In 2022, the United States Court of Appeals for the Ninth Circuit upheld the verdict against Milke. The ruling stated that Milke had knowingly and willingly destroyed thousands of documents about the case, including a journal written shortly after her conviction, documents she collected in prison, and boxes of documents by her mother concerning her criminal and habeas cases. She and her lawyers had also taken down a website and social media pages about her case. The ruling effectively ensures that Milke will never receive any compensation for her imprisonment.

== Biography ==
Debra Milke (Sadeik) was born in West Berlin, West Germany, to a U.S. Air Force father and a German mother. In 1965 the Sadeik family moved to the U.S., where Milke attended high school and college. She married Mark Milke in 1984 and gave birth to one son, Christopher Conan Milke, in 1985. Debra and Mark divorced in 1988.

== Murder investigation and conviction ==
In August 1989, Debra Milke and her son Christopher Milke moved into an apartment with Jim Styers, a man she knew through her sister. On December 2, 1989, Styers took 4-year-old Christopher to the Metrocenter mall in Phoenix, Arizona. That afternoon he called Milke, who was doing laundry at the apartment, and told her that the boy had disappeared from the mall. Styers alerted mall security, while Milke dialed 9-1-1. A missing person investigation was launched. The next day Phoenix police arrested Roger Scott, a long-time friend of Styers. After more than fourteen hours of interrogation, Scott admitted that he knew where Christopher was and that the boy was dead. He directed the police to a desert area north of Phoenix, where Christopher's body was discovered. Christopher had been shot three times in the head. According to the lead case detective Armando Saldate Jr., Scott claimed that Styers had committed the murder and that Styers had told him Milke had "wanted it done." However, Scott would not testify against Milke at her trial.

Styers, who had helped in the initial search for Christopher, was arrested and interviewed by police after being implicated by Scott. Milke voluntarily went to the Pinal County sheriff's office where she was interrogated by Saldate. The interrogation was not recorded or witnessed by anyone other than Detective Saldate. Three days later, in a written report of the interrogation, Saldate indicated Milke had confessed to arranging the murder of her son Christopher.

Scott was offered a plea-bargain, 21 years in prison for second degree murder, in return for testifying against Milke and Styers. He wanted to take the deal but his lawyer rejected it.

Milke was charged with conspiracy to commit first degree murder, kidnapping, child abuse, and first-degree murder. At trial, prosecutors relied on the alleged confession and pointed to a possible motive: Milke had taken out a $5,000 life insurance policy on her son. Milke, however, who worked at an insurance agency, had not purposefully negotiated the policy, but obtained it as a part of her regular employee benefits package. She had discussed the policy with Styers.

In October 1990, Milke was convicted of all charges and sentenced to death. Styers and Scott were charged and tried separately. Both were also convicted of first degree murder and sentenced to death.

== Appeals ==
In December 2007, the American Civil Liberties Union of Arizona filed an amicus brief in support of Milke, who by then had been on death row for 18 years. The brief raised questions "regarding the admissibility of uncorroborated and unrecorded confessions" by Milke. In September 2009, the 9th Circuit Court of Appeals found that there was "no evidence" that Milke had "voluntarily" waived her right to remain silent and ordered federal court judge Robert Broomfield to decide if the case merited a new trial. At the subsequent evidentiary hearing, Broomfield disagreed with the appeals court's opinion and found that Milke had validly waived her Miranda rights.

== Conviction overturned ==
On March 14, 2013, the U.S. Court of Appeals for the Ninth Circuit threw out Milke's conviction, ruling that Milke did not receive a fair trial. It held that Milke's rights had been violated by the failure to turn over Saldate's personnel file to the defense. That file included multiple instances of misconduct, including eight cases where confessions, indictments or convictions were thrown out because Saldate either lied under oath or violated the suspects' rights during interrogations. The court ruled that because "the prosecution did not disclose [the arresting detective] Saldate's history of misconduct," Arizona had violated its obligation to turn over exculpatory evidence to the defense. In their opinion the Circuit Court said,

Milke's alleged confession, as reported by [Pinal County Sheriff's Detective] Saldate, was the only direct evidence linking Milke to the crime. But the confession was only as good as Saldate's word, as he's the only one who claims to have heard Milke confess and there's no recording, written statement or any other evidence that Milke confessed. Saldate's credibility was crucial to the state's case against Milke. It's hard to imagine anything more relevant to the jury's—or the judge's—determination whether to believe Saldate than evidence that Saldate lied under oath and trampled the constitutional rights of suspects in discharging his official duties. If even a single juror had found Saldate untrustworthy based on the documentation that he habitually lied under oath or that he took advantage of women he had in his power, there would have been at least a hung jury. Likewise, if this evidence had been disclosed, it may well have led the judge to order a new trial, enter judgment notwithstanding the verdict or, at least, impose a sentence less than death. The prosecution did its best to impugn Milke's credibility. It wasn't entitled, at the same time, to hide the evidence that undermined Saldate's credibility. (p. 42)

== Release from jail ==
On July 8, 2013, Arizona Attorney General's Office announced its intention to retry Milke and seek the death penalty for the murder of her son. Milke was released on September 6, 2013, with a $250,000 bond set by Judge Rosa Mroz of Maricopa County Superior Court. Milke left the jail without talking to reporters, and lived in a house in Phoenix bought by her supporters. On December 18, 2013, Judge Mroz granted Saldate's request to invoke his 5th Amendment right not to testify.

== Dismissal of charges ==
On December 11, 2014, an Arizona state appeals court ordered the dismissal of murder charges against Milke, ruling that a retrial would result in unconstitutional double jeopardy. On March 17, 2015 the Arizona Supreme Court declined to review the appeal court decision, and on March 23, 2015, Judge Rosa Mroz dismissed the case.

== Civil suit ==
In 2015, Milke filed a civil lawsuit in federal court against the city of Phoenix, Maricopa County, Bill Montgomery, and Armando Saldate, among others. It stated she was a victim of malicious prosecution and was denied a fair trial. However, in 2020, after years of wrangling over discovery, a federal judge dismissed the lawsuit, saying Milke "destroyed evidence... failed to review her own files, provided materially incomplete discovery responses, and asserted baseless claims of privilege." While the judge preferred to levy a monetary sanction, because Milke stated she could not afford to pay one, the case was instead dismissed with prejudice. Milke appealed, but a federal appeals court upheld the dismissal.

In 2022, the United States Court of Appeals for the Ninth Circuit upheld the verdict against Milke. The ruling stated that Milke had knowingly and willingly destroyed thousands of documents about the case, including a journal written shortly after her conviction, documents she collected in prison, and boxes of documents by her mother concerning her criminal and habeas cases. She and her lawyers had also taken down a website and social media pages about her case. The ruling effectively ensures that Milke will never receive any compensation for her imprisonment.

== See also ==
- List of wrongful convictions in the United States
