= Dontae Sharpe =

American man who was wrongfully convicted of murder

Dontae Sharpe (born 1975) is an African American from North Carolina who was wrongly convicted of murdering a white man and spent 26 years in prison for a crime he did not commit. He was exonerated and released from prison in 2019, and given a full pardon in 2021.

Sharpe was convicted and sentenced to life in prison in 1995 for the murder of George Radcliffe. Radcliffe had been discovered in his truck with a fatal gunshot wound on February 11, 1994. Sharpe's conviction was partially based on the testimony of 15-year old Charlene Johnson, who said that she saw Sharpe shoot Radcliffe during a drug transaction. Johnson recanted her testimony two weeks later.

Sharpe spent the next 26 years attempting to overturn the wrongful conviction; in 2019, a Superior Court judge found in evidentiary hearings that the original case was no longer sound and vacated the conviction. Sharpe was subsequently released and allowed to seek a new trial. The DA declined to prosecute, acknowledging that there was no evidence.

In November 2021, Sharpe was granted a full pardon by North Carolina Governor, Roy Cooper. Cooper said that those who have been wrongfully committed like Mr Sharpe, "deserve to have that injustice fully and publicly acknowledged". With the full pardon, Mr Sharpe will be able to file a request for compensation from the state.

== See also ==
- List of wrongful convictions in the United States
