= American Justice =

American television program

- Created by: Towers Productions
- Presented by: Bill Kurtis (1992–2005); Dennis Haysbert (2021–present)
- Country of origin: United States
- No. of episodes: 255 (original series); 23 (current series)

Production
- Executive producers: Sharon Scott; Laura Fleury; Tiff Winton
- Running time: 43 minutes
- Production company: Category 6 Media

Original release
- Network: A&E Network
- Release: September 15, 1992 – September 30, 2022

American Justice is an American criminal justice television program airing on the A&E Network. From 1992–2005, the show was hosted by television reporter Bill Kurtis. The show features interesting or notable cases, such as the murder of Selena, Scarsdale Diet doctor murder, the Hillside Stranglers, Matthew Shepard, and the Wells Fargo heist, with the stories told by key players, such as police, lawyers, victims, and the perpetrators themselves. More than 250 episodes were produced in the original series, making it the longest-running documentary justice show on cable.

The original series' final new episode aired on December 10, 2005. A new version debuted on August 20, 2021, with actor Dennis Haysbert replacing Kurtis as narrator.

== Episodes ==
=== Series overview ===
Season	Episodes	Originally released	
Season	Episodes	First released	Last released
1	6	October 7, 1992	December 16, 1992
2	25	February 13, 1993	December 29, 1993
3	26	January 5, 1994	December 14, 1994
4	24	January 4, 1995	December 23, 1995
5	32	January 17, 1996	December 8, 1996
6	18	January 19, 1997	December 17, 1997
7	19	January 7, 1998	December 30, 1998
8	33	January 5, 1999	December 8, 1999
9	25	January 5, 2000	December 19, 2000
10	22	January 27, 2001	December 19, 2001
11	18	January 2, 2002	December 4, 2002
12	25	January 8, 2003	December 24, 2003
13	30	January 7, 2004	December 29, 2004
14	28	January 26, 2005	July 7, 2009
15	14	August 20, 2021	May 13, 2022
16	9	August 20, 2022	September 30, 2022

=== Season 1 (1992) ===
No. overall	No. in season	Title	Original release date
1	1	"Jonestown Massacre"	October 7, 1992
2	2	"Boston Strangler"	November 4, 1992
3	3	"Murph the Surf"	November 11, 1992
4	4	"The Hillside Stranglers"	November 18, 1992
An examination of the infamous case of serial killers Angelo Buono and Kenneth Bianchi (aka "Hillside Stranglers"), who murdered 10 young women and girls in Los Angeles in 1977 and 1978.
5	5	"Ted Bundy"	December 2, 1992
6	6	"John Wayne Gacy: Mass Murderer"	December 16, 1992

=== Season 2 (1993) ===
No. overall	No. in season	Title	Original release date
7	1	"Dr. Jeffrey MacDonald: The Green Beret Killer"	February 13, 1993
8	2	"The Trial of Adolf Eichmann"	February 13, 1993
9	3	"City Killer Gangs"	April 28, 1993
Bugs Moran, Lucky Luciano
10	4	"Jean Harris"	April 28, 1993
Covers the case of school headmistress Jean Harris, who was accused of murdering her lover, "Scarsdale Diet" author Dr. Herman Tarnower.
11	5	"Howard Hughes Biography Hoax"	April 28, 1993
12	6	"Charles Starkweather"	June 23, 1993
13	7	"Richard Speck"	June 30, 1993
14	8	"Wayne Williams"	July 28, 1993
15	9	"Mafia Wars"	August 11, 1993
16	10	"Bonnie and Clyde"	August 11, 1993
17	11	"Mafia (The Prohibition Years)"	September 8, 1993
18	12	"Mafia (Birth of the American Mafia)"	September 15, 1993
19	13	"Mafia (The Kennedys and the Mob)"	September 22, 1993
20	14	"Target: Mafia (Gangbusters)"	September 29, 1993
22	15	"Target: Mafia (Empire of Crime)"	October 6, 1993
23	16	"Mobfathers: Part 1"	October 13, 1993
24	17	"Mobfathers: Part 2"	October 20, 1993
25	18	"Mobfathers: Part 3"	October 27, 1993
26	19	"Mike Tyson: Rape on Trial"	November 3, 1993
27	20	"Dahmer: Mystery of a Serial Killer"	November 10, 1993
28	21	"The Rosenbergs"	November 17, 1993
29	22	"Fire Starters"	November 24, 1993
Happy Land fire and Hartford circus fire
30	23	"Alcatraz: Escaping America's Toughest Prison"	December 1, 1993
31	24	"KKK: Hate Crimes in America"	December 1, 1993
32	25	"Vigilante Justice"	December 29, 1993
Bernard Goetz New York City Subway shootings, and Gary Plauché who killed his son's alleged molester.

=== Season 3 (1994) ===
No. overall	No. in season	Title	Original release date
33	1	"Mass Murder: An American Tragedy"	January 5, 1994
San Ysidro McDonald's massacre, Luby's shooting; Edmond post office shooting; Standard Gravure shooting
34	2	"Hostage Takers"	January 12, 1994
Achille Lauro hijacking
35	3	"The Wrong Man"	January 19, 1994
Patricia Stallings
36	4	"The Great Brinks Heist"	January 19, 1994
37	5	"Fugitives"	February 2, 1994
John List
38	6	"Death Penalty"	February 9, 1994
The stories of Caryl Chessman, William Henry Furman, Gary Gilmore and Donald Gaskins
39	7	"Juvenile Justice"	February 23, 1994
40	8	"Mob Rats"	March 2, 1994
Looks at Joseph Valachi, the first Mafioso to break the code of silence, and Sammy Gravano, who helped convict the Gambino family boss.
41	9	"War Crimes"	March 30, 1994
Nuremberg trials; My Lai massacre; John Demjanjuk
42	10	"Satan: Rituals and Abuse"	April 6, 1994
43	11	"Lorena Bobbitt: Women and Violence"	April 13, 1994
Examines the highly charged issue of battered women. Do they have the right to respond with violence, and under what circumstances? Will the acquittal of Lorena Bobbitt lead to an "open season" on men? And why are women increasingly involved in drug and gang activity?
44	12	"Prison Justice"	April 20, 1994
45	13	"Pleading Insane"	May 4, 1994
John Hinckley Jr.; David Berkowitz
46	14	"Cops on Trial"	May 4, 1994
Examines how police are treated as defendants and the types of sentences they face; and reveals research results that show that police and the general public are held to different standards of justice.
47	15	"Fighting Words: The First Amendment"	June 1, 1994
48	16	"Jim Bakker: Crime in the Name of God"	June 15, 1994
49	17	"Reginald Denny: Jury Under Siege"	July 13, 1994
50	18	"Attack at Waco"	August 3, 1994
The story of the tragic assault on the Branch Davidian compound in Texas and the subsequent efforts to determine the facts and assign blame.
51	19	"Sex, Lies and Harassment"	August 17, 1994
The legal aspects of sexual harassment in the workplace.
52	20	"Gangbusters"	September 7, 1994
Looks at: the "Secret 6", a group of civic-minded Chicago businessmen who aided in bringing down Al Capone; drug trade in a Boston housing development; and gang violence in the Midwest.
53	21	"The Attica Riot: Chaos Behind Bars"	September 14, 1994
54	22	"Private Eyes"	September 21, 1994
55	23	"Prostitution, Sex and the Law"	October 19, 1994
From the street-corner hooker to the high-class Hollywood call girl, this episode examines how the sellers of sex are brought to justice.
56	24	"The Sting"	November 23, 1994
Marion Barry
57	25	"Riot: the Chicago Conspiracy Trial"	November 30, 1994
Examination of the turbulent events behind the 1968 anti-war riots in Chicago which led to the "Conspiracy to Commit Riot" trials of the famed Chicago Seven.
58	26	"Divorce Wars"	December 14, 1994
Examines how divorce has changed from the days when women were considered the legal "property" of their husbands to today's high-stakes divorce contests, typified by the battle between Donald Trump and Ivana Trump.

=== Season 4 (1995) ===
No. overall	No. in season	Title	Original release date
59	1	"The Quiz Show Scandal and Other Frauds"	January 3, 1995
Examines the game-show scam involving distinguished professor Charles Van Doren.
60	2	"Kidnapped"	January 4, 1995
A look at the cases of biathlete Kari Swenson in Montana and Exxon executive Sidney Reso in New Jersey, and examines just how effective law enforcement authorities are in investigating and negotiating tense kidnap situations.
61	3	"Godfathers vs. The Law"	January 11, 1995
Profiles of top gangsters and the lawmen who have risked their lives to defeat the underworld.
62	4	"Celebrities on Trial"	February 8, 1995
63	5	"Spies: Betraying a Nation"	February 25, 1995
Aldrich Ames, Jonathan Pollard, John Anthony Walker
64	6	"Defending the Mob"	March 15, 1995
A look at the career of Frank Ragano, attorney to Florida mob boss Santo Trafficante, Jr. and corrupt Teamster leader Jimmy Hoffa.
65	7	"Witness Protection"	March 29, 1995
Interviews with several gangsters, who reveal what their lives are like after getting plastic surgery, new identities, legitimate jobs, and moving into new neighborhoods.
66	8	"Bad Medicine"	April 19, 1995
Includes a nurse suspected of killing babies in her hospital's pediatric intensive care unit; a doctor charged with nine counts of second degree murder; and the owner of the "Personal Best" plastic surgery centers who was accused of allowing his chauffeur to perform medical duties and was hit with 212 malpractice suits.
67	9	"Mob Ladies"	May 10, 1995
Features Virginia Hill, who helped Bugsy Siegel build Las Vegas, Arlyne Weiss-Brickman, who trafficked in heroin even while working as an FBI informer, and "Mafia Princess" Antoinette Giancana, who professes great love for her father, mob boss Sam Giancana.
68	10	"Lights! Camera! Courtroom!"	May 24, 1995
69	11	"Autopsy"	June 14, 1995
70	12	"Hired Guns"	June 28, 1995
Includes the case of a corrupt businessman who had his partner murdered and a millionaire who arranged to have his wife killed to avoid splitting his fortune with her in divorce proceedings.
71	13	"Cruel and Unusual"	July 5, 1995
Includes: Henry Young, who was kept in the "Dark Hole" of Alcatraz; Tommy Ortiz, who was beaten by prison guards wearing lead-filled gloves; and John Evans, whose body was charred in the electric chair.
72	14	"Military Justice"	August 9, 1995
Eddie Slovik; Robert R. Garwood; Clayton Lonetree
73	15	"Stalkers: Deadly Obsession"	August 16, 1995
Stalking of Theresa Saldana and Dawn Wilson
74	16	"Undercover Infiltrators"	September 6, 1995
75	17	"Baby Snatchers"	September 13, 1995
76	18	"Jailhouse Lawyers"	September 20, 1995
77	19	"Assassins"	October 11, 1995
Sirhan Sirhan; Lynette Fromme; James Earl Ray
78	20	"LAPD"	October 25, 1995
79	21	"Bombers"	November 8, 1995
Michael Stevens; George Metesky; Robert Chambliss
80	22	"Deadly Force"	December 13, 1995
Features the police bombing of the MOVE headquarters in Philadelphia, which killed 11, and the shootings of Randy Weaver's wife and son at Ruby Ridge.
81 82	23 24	"Why O.J. Simpson Won Why O. J. Simpson Lost: The Civil Trial"	December 23, 1995
This 2 hour special showing both O.J. Simpson's Murder trial (which he won) and his Civil trial (which he lost).

=== Season 5 (1996) ===
No. overall	No. in season	Title	Original release date
82	1	"Cop Killers"	January 17, 1996
Includes the murder of Texas State Trooper Bill Davidson by Ronald Ray Howard, who claimed gangster rap music by Tupac Shakur encouraged him to shoot the officer, and the execution of rookie cop Eddie Bryne by members of a drug gang, while he sat in his patrol car guarding the home of a drug witness in Queens.
83	2	"The Chicago Mob"	February 7, 1996
Includes segments on Al "Scarface" Capone, Anthony "Joe Batters" Accardo, and Sam "Mooney" Giancana.
84	3	"The Sam Sheppard Story"	February 15, 1996
Dr. Sam Sheppard is convicted of murdering his wife, Marilyn Reese Sheppard, in 1954 and was acquitted for the murder ten years later.
85	4	"Murder in the Family"	March 6, 1996
Freeman family murders
86	5	"Vegas and the Mob"	April 10, 1996
Two-hour special featuring an interview with Frank Rosenthal, a former casino manager who was the basis of Robert De Niro's character in the movie Casino.
87	6	"The Long Island Railroad Massacre"	April 24, 1996
A look at the mass murder committed by Colin Ferguson on board a New York commuter train in December 1993. Includes Ferguson's bizarre attempts to defend himself at his trial.
88	7	"Bounty Hunters"	May 11, 1996
89	8	"Crime of Passion: The Pamela Smart Story"	May 25, 1996
Explores the dark side of passion by examining the case of Pamela Smart who seduced her lover, a 15-year-old, into killing her husband.
90	9	"John Wayne Gacy: Buried Secrets"	June 5, 1996
91	10	"When Cops Kill"	June 19, 1996
92	11	"Hot Pursuit"	July 17, 1996
93	12	"Great Crimes & Trials: John Christie of Rillington Place"	July 28, 1996
94	13	"Dennis Nilsen: The Kindly Killer"	August 18, 1996
95	14	"Mob Hit Men"	August 21, 1996
Nicodemo Scarfo, John Stanfa
96	15	"Bamber Family Murder"	August 25, 1996
97	16	"Richard Ramirez: Night Stalker"	September 1, 1996
98	17	"Menendez Murders"	September 4, 1996
99	18	"Hammersmith Murders"	September 22, 1996
100	19	"I Confess"	September 25, 1996
Central Park jogger case
101	20	"James Hanratty: A6 Murder"	September 29, 1996
102	21	"To Catch a Killer: Homicide Detectives"	October 2, 1996
1994 Virginia bar murders
103	22	"The Disappearance of Jimmy Hoffa"	October 6, 1996
104	23	"Caryl Chessman"	October 13, 1996
105	24	"The McKay Kidnapping"	October 20, 1996
106	25	"Black Panther"	October 20, 1996
Donald Neilson
107	26	"Free to Kill: The Polly Klaas Murder"	October 23, 1996
108	27	"Kennedy Assassination"	November 17, 1996
Assassination of John F. Kennedy
109	28	"The Massacre of the Tsar"	November 17, 1996
Murder of the Romanov family
110	29	"Death Row Women"	November 20, 1996
Velma Barfield; Andrea Hicks Jackson; Lynda Lyon Block
111	30	"Neville Heath: The Lady Killer"	November 24, 1996
112	31	"The Defenders"	December 4, 1996
113	32	"Mafia Story aka the showdown"	December 8, 1996
Gambino crime family

=== Season 6 (1997) ===
No. overall	No. in season	Title	Original release date
114	1	"The Yorkshire Ripper"	January 19, 1997
115	2	"Narcs"	January 22, 1997
116	3	"Eyewitness"	January 29, 1997
Howard Lee Haupt
117	4	"Amy Fisher Story"	March 23, 1997
118	5	"Roberts, Witney and Duddy"	April 27, 1997
Shepherd's Bush murders
119	6	"Night Stalker"	April 30, 1997
120	7	"Profilers"	April 30, 1997
David Carpenter; Arthur Shawcross; Jack Unterweger
121	8	"Presumed Guilty"	May 21, 1997
Features the Jeanine Nicarico murder case and how Rolando Cruz was falsely convicted and imprisoned for the murder until a man named Brian Dugan later confessed to the murder.
122	9	"Jewish Mobsters"	May 28, 1997
Immigration and organized crime; Meyer Lansky; Bugsy Siegel; Moe Dalitz and Dutch Schultz.
123	10	"The Great Train Robbery"	June 29, 1997
124	11	"Crime Family"	August 13, 1997
Genovese crime family
125	12	"The Scarsdale Diet Doctor Murder"	September 3, 1997
126	13	"Von Bülow: A Wealth of Evidence"	September 17, 1997
An examination of snooty, aristocratic Claus von Bülow and if he attempted to murder his wife Sunny
127	14	"Texas Cheerleader Murder Plot"	October 22, 1997
Probes the bizarre case of Wanda Holloway, who would stop at nothing—including murder—to get her daughter on the cheerleading squad.
128	15	"The Preppie Murder"	November 19, 1997
A probe of the death of young Jennifer Levin, who was killed in New York City's Central Park by Robert Chambers, a handsome prep-school graduate
129	16	"The Donnie Brasco Story"	November 19, 1997
The true story of Joe Pistone, the FBI agent who risked his life to infiltrate a ruthless New York Mafia family and gather evidence against several crime bosses
130	17	"Crime of Passion: The Pamela Smart Story"	December 3, 1997
131	18	"Murder 'In Cold Blood'"	December 17, 1997
Chronicles the 1959 Clutter family murders in Kansas, and the investigation that led to the capture, trial, and execution of their two killers, Richard Hickock and Perry Edward Smith.

=== Season 7 (1998) ===
No. overall	No. in season	Title	Original release date
132	1	"Most Wanted"	January 7, 1998
133	2	"The Pizza Connection"	January 28, 1998
The story of how the FBI, the DEA and Italy's Polizia di Stato, among other agencies, busted one of the largest drug rings ever involving both the Sicilian and American Mafias importing $1.65 billion USD worth of heroin into the United States between 1975 and 1984. The exploding case led investigators from sidewalk pizzerias in New York, Philadelphia and the Midwest to Zurich's financial districts and Gaetano Badalamenti, a former member of the Sicilian Mafia Commission. Resulted in the longest trial in American judicial history as 22 defendants were tried for approximately 17 months from 1985 to 1987.
134	3	"The John Lennon Assassination"	February 25, 1998
The John Lennon Assassination
135	4	"L.A. Mob"	March 11, 1998
Jack Dragna and Jimmy Fratianno
136	5	"False Witness"	April 22, 1998
The strange case of Gary Dotson, who wasn't released from prison even when the woman who accused him of rape admitted that she'd been lying.
137	6	"Spree Killer"	May 6, 1998
A look at the crimes and capture of Charles Starkweather and Caril Ann Fugate, teenage lovers who murdered 10 people in the 1950s.
138	7	"Framed"	May 27, 1998
The shocking story of Clarence Brandley, an innocent man who was convicted of murder and spent seven years on death row before being cleared.
139	8	"Dead Woman Walking: The Karla Faye Tucker Story"	July 1, 1998
Recalls the controversial life and death of the first woman executed in Texas since 1984.
140	9	"Hunting Bambi: The Laurie Bembenek Story"	July 8, 1998
The case of beautiful ex-cop Lawrencia "Bambi" Bembenek, who escaped after spending nine years in prison for the murder of her husband's ex-wife.
141	10	"Charles Whitman: Austin Sniper"	August 2, 1998
142	11	"Marriage and Murder"	August 13, 1997
An examination of three cases where husbands and wives have murdered their spouses. Features Charlene Brundidge, who killed her husband, then later won clemency because she was an abused wife.
143	12	"Green Beret Murder Mystery"	August 12, 1998
Former Green Beret, Jeffrey R. MacDonald, appeals his conviction for the murders of his wife and children.
144	13	"Hunt for the Unabomber"	October 7, 1998
145	14	"The Heidi Fleiss Story"	October 19, 1998
An exclusive interview with incarcerated madam Heidi Fleiss reveals her thoughts on her past employment and eventual conviction.
146	15	"High Crimes and Misdemeanors"	October 28, 1998
Watergate scandal, Alcee Hastings, Clinton–Lewinsky scandal
147	16	"Death Row Prostitute: Aileen Wuornos"	November 18, 1998
Aileen Wuornos, self-described "highway hooker," may be the first woman to fit the profile of a serial killer.
148	17	"Selena: Murder of a Star"	December 2, 1998
Investigates the murder of Tejano singing sensation Selena and the case against her convicted assassin, Yolanda Saldívar.
149	18	"Fall from Grace"	December 23, 1998
The stories of high-profile people who have been involved in scandals, including sportscaster Marv Albert, former Rep. Mel Reynolds and former Miss America Bess Myerson.
150	19	"A Civil Action"	December 30, 1998
A 1982 civil lawsuit brought by residents of Woburn, Massachusetts, following the leukemia-related deaths of 5 children is examined

=== Season 8 (1999) ===
No. overall	No. in season	Title	Original release date
151	1	"The Sinatra Kidnapping"	January 5, 1999
In 1963, kidnappers get a $240,000 ransom for Frank Sinatra Jr.
152	2	"The Larry Flynt Story: Hustling the First Amendment"	January 20, 1999
Hustler publisher, Larry Flynt, wins a Supreme Court ruling on the First Amendment.
153	3	"Mark Chapman"	February 7, 1999
154	4	"A Teenage Murder Mystery"	February 17, 1999
Examines the murder of 16-year-old Laurie Show, whose last words led to the arrest of Lisa Michelle Lambert.
155	5	"Leonard Lake and Charles Ng"	February 21, 1999
156	6	"Leopold and Loeb"	February 21, 1999
157	7	"Body in the Trunk Murders"	March 7, 1999
158	8	"Gary Heidnik and Jeffrey Dahmer"	March 7, 1999
159	9	"A Woman Scorned: The Betty Broderick Story"	March 24, 1999
Betty Broderick murders her ex-husband and his new wife in 1989; after her husband leaves her for a younger woman.
160	10	"Gaston Dominici and the Drummond Murders"	April 4, 1999
161	11	"Judge Joe Peel"	April 11, 1999
162	12	"A Murder in Greenwich: The Martha Moxley Case"	April 21, 1999
The murder of Martha Moxley gains worldwide attention in 1975 as the murder suspect, Michael Skakel, is the nephew of Ethel Skakel Kennedy, the widow of Senator Robert F. Kennedy.
163	13	"John Duffy: Railway Killer"	May 9, 1999
164	14	"Ma Barker and Other Public Enemies"	May 9, 1999
165	15	"Myth Of A Serial Killer: The Henry Lee Lucas Story"	May 23, 1999
166	16	"Graham Young: The Compulsive Poisoner"	June 6, 1999
167	17	"Butch Defeo"	June 6, 1999
168	18	"Justice Denied: The Hurricane Carter Story"	June 14, 1999
Boxer Rubin "Hurricane" Carter was wrongfully convicted of triple murder and served 19 years in prison before his conviction was overturned in 1985.
169	19	"The Perfect Murder: The Shannon Mohr Story"	June 30, 1999
The marriage of David Davis and Shannon Mohr comes to an abrupt end when Shannon is killed in what was believed to have been a horseback-riding accident.
170	20	"Body of Evidence: The Tom Capano Trial"	July 7, 1999
The story of the former Delaware prosecutor, Thomas Capano, who was sentenced to death for the murder of his ex-lover, Anne Marie Fahey.
171	21	"Justice Denied: The Wrong Place, the Wrong Time"	July 21, 1999
Leah Bundy
172	22	"Who Killed the Candy Heiress? The Helen Brach Story"	August 4, 1999
173	23	"Lethal Injection: The Hospital Murders"	August 11, 1999
Robert Diaz
174	24	"Till Death Do Us Part: The Barbara Stager Story"	August 25, 1999
Barbara Stager is convicted in 1989 of murdering her second husband, Russell Stager, after being acquitted of killing her first husband.
175	25	"The Jonesboro Schoolyard Ambush"	August 25, 1999
176	26	"Drowning In Lies: The Trial Of Edward Post"	September 22, 1999
After a mistrial and a successful appeal, Edward Post pleads guilty to murdering his wife during his third trial.
177	27	"Rape in Connecticut: The Alex Kelly Story"	September 29, 1999
178	28	"Duty, Honor and Murder"	October 6, 1999
179	29	"It's Not My Fault: Strange Defenses"	October 27, 1999
Dan White, Scott Falater, Kathy Willets
180	30	"Vigilante Dad"	November 4, 1999
181	31	"Donald Merrett: The Murderous Buccaneer"	November 7, 1999
182	32	"Sister Against Sister: The Twin Murder Plot"	November 24, 1999
Han twins murder plot
183	33	"Payback for a Bully"	December 8, 1999
Murder of Bobby Kent

=== Season 9 (2000) ===
No. overall	No. in season	Title	Original release date
184	1	"Blueprint for Murder"	January 5, 2000
185	2	"Roy Fontaine: Deadly Butler"	January 16, 2000
186	3	"A Parent's Nightmare"	February 3, 2000
Murder of Jaclyn Dowaliby
187	4	"Dr. John Bodkin Adams"	February 20, 2000
188	5	"Death Row Radical: Mumia Abu-Jamal"	February 23, 2000
189	6	"Gainesville Murderer"	February 23, 2000
190	7	"Getting Away with Murder"	March 15, 2000
Killing of Brenda Schaefer
191	8	"Murder in a College Town"	March 22, 2000
192	9	"The Life and Death of Brandon Teena"	March 22, 2000
193	10	"Dancing, Drugs and Murder"	April 13, 2000
194	11	"The Trial of Louise Woodward"	April 13, 2000
195	12	"Deadly Magnolia: Patricia Allanson"	May 11, 2000
196	13	"Oil, Money and Murder"	May 24, 2000
197	14	"The Killer Within"	June 7, 2000
Murder of Kathy Bonney
198	15	"Donald Hume"	June 11, 2000
199	16	"Kill Thy Neighbor"	June 21, 2000
George Trepal
200	17	"The Wife Who Knew Too Much"	July 6, 2000
201	18	"When a Child Kills"	August 9, 2000
202	19	"Free to Murder Again"	August 16, 2000
Kenneth McDuff
203	20	"The California Killing Field"	September 20, 2000
Leonard Lake and Charles Ng
204	21	"DeFeo and Benson: Inheritance Killers"	October 1, 2000
205	22	"Murder on a Reservation"	October 17, 2000
Leonard Peltier
206	23	"Dangerous Medicine"	November 28, 2000
207	24	"Dr. Buck Ruxton"	October 10, 2000
208	25	"Family Secret: The Death of Lisa Steinberg"	December 19, 2000

=== Season 10 (2001) ===
No. overall	No. in season	Title	Original release date
209	1	"Justice Denied: Trial and Error"	January 27, 2001
210	2	"Hiding in Plain Sight: Tales of a Fugitive"	January 31, 2001
211	3	"Mother on Death Row"	February 21, 2001
Darlie Routier
212	4	"William Joyce, Lord Haw Haw"	March 4, 2001
213	5	"The Atlanta Child Murders"	March 7, 2001
214	6	"The Erin Brockovich Story"	March 14, 2001
215	7	"Who Wants to Kill a Millionaire?"	April 11, 2001
Ted Binion
216	8	"Dealing with the DevilLying Eyes"	April 25, 2001
Marion Albert Pruett
217	9	"A Son's Confession"	April 25, 2001
218	10	"The Matthew Shepard Story"	May 23, 2001
219	11	"Lying Eyes"	June 20, 2001
Jennifer Thompson and Ronald Cotton
220	12	"Sir Harry Oakes & the Bahamas Murder Mystery"	July 22, 2001
221	13	"Shotgun Justice"	July 22, 2001
222	14	"Raised on Hate"	August 8, 2001
Chevie Kehoe and Daniel Lewis Lee
223	15	"Shattered Innocence: The Fells Acres Abuse Case"	August 22, 2001
Fells Acres day care sexual abuse trial
224	16	"Marijuana and Murder"	September 19, 2001
225	17	"The Boy Who Saw Too Much"	October 10, 2001
226	18	"Conspiracy to Kill: The Rae Carruth Story"	October 10, 2001
227	19	"Like Mother, Like Son: Sante and Kenny Kimes"	November 14, 2001
228	20	"The Disappearance of Madalyn Murray O'Hair"	November 28, 2001
229	21	"Eliminating the Competition"	December 12, 2001
Tommy Burks
230	22	"Death in a Small Town"	December 19, 2001

=== Season 11 (2002) ===
No. overall	No. in season	Title	Original release date
231	1	"Millions Of Reasons To Kill"	January 2, 2002
Dana Ewell
232	2	"A Mother's Story of Murder"	January 9, 2002
Debra Milke
233	3	"The Girl in the Box"	February 6, 2002
Kidnapping of Colleen Stan
234	4	"Driven to Kill"	March 6, 2002
235	5	"Who Is the Lipstick Killer?"	March 20, 2002
236	6	"The Cult Murders"	April 3, 2002
Jeffrey Lundgren
237	7	"An Execution in Doubt"	April 24, 2002
Roger Keith Coleman
238	8	"Brutal Revenge"	May 29, 2002
Murder of Sheila Bellush
239	9	"Suicide by Execution"	June 12, 2002
240	10	"The Witness and the Hitman"	June 19, 2002
Harry Aleman
241	11	"While the Children Slept"	July 10, 2002
242	12	"The Monster Inside"	July 31, 2002
243	13	"We, the Jury: 10th Anniversary Show"	August 7, 2002
244	14	"Vanished"	September 4, 2002
Speed Freak Killers
245	15	"Crib Death?"	September 25, 2002
246	16	"The Black Widow of Vegas"	October 16, 2002
Margaret Rudin
247	17	"In the Hands of a Child"	October 30, 2002
248	18	"Justifiable Homicide?"	December 4, 2002

=== Season 12 (2003) ===
No. overall	No. in season	Title	Original release date
249	1	"Who Killed Hannah Hill?"	January 8, 2003
250	2	"The Andrea Yates Story"	January 15, 2003
251	3	"Mother's Betrayal"	January 29, 2003
Kathleen Bush
252	4	"A Questionable Doctor"	March 5, 2003
Stan Naramore
253	5	"A Murder Before Homecoming"	March 19, 2003
Murder of Heather Rich
254	6	"To Save Their Souls"	April 2, 2003
John List
255	7	"Shamed Into Confession"	April 23, 2003
James Harry Reyos
256	8	"Death of a Bride"	May 28, 2003
Murder of Gladys Ricart
257	9	"Mail Order Murder"	June 4, 2003
Murder of Anastasia Solovieva
258	10	"The Corcoran Eight"	June 11, 2003
California State Prison, Corcoran
259	11	"The Central Park jogger case: What Went Wrong?"	July 16, 2003
260	12	"Murder Online"	July 23, 2003
Sharee Miller
261	13	"The San Francisco Dog Mauling"	August 6, 2003
Death of Diane Whipple
262	14	"Mystery at Sea"	August 13, 2003
Alvin Latham
263	15	"Don't Mess with Texas"	August 27, 2003
Murder of Texas Ranger Bobby Doherty
264	16	"Shots in the Dark"	September 10, 2003
H. Rap Brown
265	17	"The Wells Fargo Heist"	September 24, 2003
Ring v. Arizona
266	18	"Mistaken Identity"	October 8, 2003
Terence Garner
267	19	"The Yosemite Killer"	October 29, 2003
Cary Stayner
268	20	"Blood Brothers"	November 12, 2003
Murder of Terry King
269	21	"Murder on the Boardwalk"	November 26, 2003
Konstantinos Fotopoulos
270	22	"For Love or Money"	December 10, 2003
Murder of Steven Beard
271	23	"What the Girl Saw"	December 17, 2003
Clarence Elkins
272	24	"Another Man's Crime"	December 24, 2003
Jeffery Scott Hornoff

=== Season 13 (2004) ===
No. overall	No. in season	Title	Original release date
249	1	"A Deadly Dose"	January 7, 2004
Murder of Judi Eftenoff
250	2	"Case of Robert Blake"	February 4, 2004
Murder of Bonny Lee Bakley
251	3	"Murder by Mercedes"	February 18, 2004
Murder of David Lynn Harris
252	4	"The Happy Face Killer"	March 10, 2004
Keith Jesperson
253	5	"Playing with Fire"	March 17, 2004
Kenneth Richey
254	6	"Traces in Blood"	April 7, 2004
Murder of Girly Chew Hossencofft
255	7	"The Excedrin Killings"	April 21, 2004
Stella Nickell
256	8	"A Soldier's Secret"	May 5, 2004
Murder of Barry Winchell
257	9	"Blood Relations"	May 12, 2004
Murders of Martha Parmer Durrett and Lindar Parmer Harrison
258	10	"Sins of a Priest"	May 26, 2004
John Geoghan
259	11	"Under Suspicion"	June 9, 2004
Catherine Shelton
260	12	"Thrill Killers"	June 23, 2004
Erika and Benjamin Sifrit
261	13	"Stacey's Story"	July 7, 2004
Stacey Lannert
262	TBA	"The Black Widower"	July 14, 2004
Gerald Hand
263	15	"Murder and Mrs. B."	July 21, 2004
Diane Borchardt
264	16	"Murder in Paradise"	August 4, 2004
Murder of Dana Ireland
265	17	"Child's Play, Deadly Play"	August 18, 2004
Lionel Tate
266	18	"Double Life, Double Murder"	September 22, 2004
Murders of Ruby Joyner and Halima Jones
267	19	"The Doctor's Wife"	September 29, 2004
Murder of David Stephens
268	20	"Gangbusters: The Story of Al Capone"	October 9, 2004
269	21	"The Bully of Toulon"	October 16, 2004
Curtis Thompson
270	22	"Daughter Dearest"	October 27, 2004
Murder of Vicki Robinson
271	23	"A Model Murder"	November 3, 2004
Murder of Linda Sobek
272	24	"The Susan Smith story: A Mother's Confession"	November 10, 2004
A look back at the shocking story of how Susan Smith drowned her two sons and then tried to fool the nation into believing that an African-American man had committed the crime
273	25	"Who Whacked Zack"	November 17, 2004
Murder of Jeff Zack
274	26	"Love Triangle"	November 24, 2004
Murder of Leann Fletcher
275	27	"Serial Wife"	December 1, 2004
Jill Coit
276	28	"The Wrath of Mrs. Jones"	December 8, 2004
Murder of Jack Edward Jones
277	29	"Accused in Appalachia"	December 22, 2004
Murder of Dennis Pease
278	30	"The Perfect Wife"	December 29, 2004
Roger Scaggs

=== Season 14 (2005) ===
No. overall	No. in season	Title	Original release date
279	1	"The Scott Peterson Trial"	January 26, 2005
Murder of Laci Peterson
280	2	"The Rise and Fall of the Jewish Mobster"	February 15, 2005
Benjamin Fein; Abe Reles; Dutch Schultz; Meyer Lansky and Bugsy Siegel.
281	3	"A Warrant to Kill"	February 16, 2005
A deputy sheriff's dispute with a Houston woman ends in her death.
282	4	"Countdown to an Execution"	March 16, 2005
Crusading attorney Juliet Yackel tries to save her client, Darnell Williams, from execution.
283	5	"The Brit and the Bodybuilder"	April 6, 2005
Murder of Farah Fratta
284	6	"Murder in the Court"	April 27, 2005
A man on trial for a violent crime attacks a sheriff's deputy and takes a gun, then stalks the courthouse, guns down the judge, a court reporter, and another deputy, and makes his escape.
285	7	"What Happened to Carrie Culberson?"	May 25, 2005
An Blanchester, Ohio man is convicted of murder after his girlfriend, a former cheerleader, disappears.
286	8	"Confession in Question"	June 15, 2005
Martin Tankleff
287	9	"The Bridge Murders"	July 9, 2005
Murders of Julie and Robin Kerry
288	10	"The Brothers Kimble"	July 23, 2005
A man is accused of hiring his brother to kill his wife.
289	11	"Hamptons Murder Mystery"	August 13, 2005
An electrician is convicted of bludgeoning investment banker Ted Ammon to death.
290	12	"The Deer Hunting Murder"	August 20, 2005
A shooting victim's husband takes out an extraordinary amount of life insurance on her before the incident.
291	13	"Blood on the Staircase"	September 10, 2005
North Carolina author Michael Peterson is accused of killing his wife.
292	14	"Lies of a Friend"	October 1, 2005
George Lewis was a neighborhood crime watch activist from Gulfport, Florida. Now, he serving life in prison for the 1984 murder of neighbor Karen Gregory.
295	15	"Palm Beach Law"	December 10, 2005
Two women run an all-female law office in Palm Beach, Florida.

=== Season 15 (2021–2022) ===
No. overall	No. in season	Title	Original release date
296	1	"Friends Til the End"	August 20, 2021
Murder of Sarah Stern
297	2	"Poisonous Hearts"	August 26, 2021
Killing of Mary Yoder
298	3	"Shots Fired"	September 2, 2021
Murder of Laquan McDonald
299	4	"The Bad Doctor"	September 9, 2021
Valerie McDaniel & Leon Jacob
300	5	"Death by Text"	September 16, 2021
Death of Conrad Roy
301	6	"Killer Catfish"	September 23, 2021
Murder of Cari Farver
302	7	"Fame, Football, Fatality"	March 22, 2022
Murder of Odin Lloyd
303	8	"Loved to Death"	April 1, 2022
Murder of Billy Payne and Billie Jean Hayworth
304	9	"Money, Lies and Murder"	April 8, 2022
Murder of Samira Frasch
305	10	"Judge, Jury and Executioner"	April 15, 2022
Kaufman County murders
306	11	"In the Company of A Killer"	April 22, 2022
Murder of Michelle Mockbee
307	12	"A Family Vanished"	April 29, 2022
Luis Toledo
308	13	"Bad Blood"	May 6, 2022
Donald Hartburg
309	14	"A Tragic Night in Dallas"	May 13, 2022
Murder of Botham Jean

=== Season 16 (2022) ===
No. overall	No. in season	Title	Original release date
310	1	"The Monster in Muskegon"	August 20, 2022
Murder of Jessica Heeringa
311	2	"A Dangerous Calling"	August 20, 2022
Murder of Chiquita Tate
312	3	"Justice for April"	August 27, 2022
Murder of April Millsap
313	4	"Internal Affairs"	August 27, 2022
Murder of Lisa Techel
314	5	"The Enemy Within"	September 3, 2022
Murder of Ariet Girgis
315	6	"Strangers Online"	September 10, 2022
Murder of Nicole Lovell
316	7	"Sleeping with the Enemy"	September 17, 2022
Murder of Tyrone Hassel III
317	8	"A Deadly Con"	September 24, 2022
Richard Beasley
318	9	"Hiding in Plain Sight"	September 30, 2022
Murder of Ashley Biggs
