= Behind Mansion Walls =

American TV crime documentary series (2011–2013)

- Genre: Documentary
- Presented by: Christopher Mason
- Narrated by: Bill Ratner
- Country of origin: United States
- Original language: English
- No. of seasons: 3
- No. of episodes: 39

Production
- Executive producers: Andrew Farrell; Geoff Fitzpatrick; Pamela Deutsch
- Running time: 20 to 23 minutes
- Production company: Beyond Productions

Original release
- Network: Investigation Discovery
- Release: June 6, 2011 – August 29, 2013; Reruns: 2011–present

Behind Mansion Walls is an American documentary television series on Investigation Discovery that debuted on June 6, 2011, ending in 2013 at completion of its third season. The series, hosted by Christopher Mason, tells the stories of crime and investigation that are unveiled in wealthy families and relationships, with conspiracies, hidden accounts, false identities and secret affairs. It tells stories of murder and mystery on a grand scale. The victims and individuals involved in cases come from upscale levels of society, from oil tycoons to real estate moguls.

== Episodes ==
Season	Episodes	Originally released	
Season	Episodes	First released	Last released
1	13	June 6, 2011	August 29, 2011
2	13	June 7, 2012	August 30, 2012
3	13	May 23, 2013	August 29, 2013

=== Season 1 (2011) ===
No. overall	No. in season	Title	Original release date
1	1	"The Enemy Within"	June 6, 2011
Murder of Caren Koslow and Society Murders
2	2	"The Perfect Crime"	June 13, 2011
Dana Ewell and Leopold and Loeb
3	3	"The Wayward Son"	June 20, 2011
Steven Benson and Murder of Charlie White
4	4	"Death In Palm Beach"	June 27, 2011
Murder of Lita McClinton and Rose Keil
5	5	"Fatal Dynasty"	July 4, 2011
Murders of Dave Schultz and Patricia Margello
6	6	"Rich Justice"	July 11, 2011
T. Cullen Davis and Thomas Capano
7	7	"Fatal Greed"	July 18, 2011
Glensheen murders and Billionaire Boys Club
8	8	"A Family Feud"	July 25, 2011
Murder of Dean Milo in Akron, Ohio; Murders of Donald and Marsha Levine in Munster, Indiana
9	9	"Husbands & Wives"	August 1, 2011
Murder of Diane Pikul in Newburgh, New York; Murder of Stanley Cohen in Miami
10	10	"Secret Lives"	August 8, 2011
Robert Durst and Helmuth Buxbaum
11	11	"Beverly Hills Kids"	August 15, 2011
Murders of Gerald and Vera Woodman and Murder of Henry Harrison Kyle
12	12	"The Hired Help"	August 22, 2011
Murder of Sheila Bellush and Murder of Megan Kalajzich
13	13	"Getting Away With It"	August 29, 2011
Joan Robinson Hill and Susan Cummings

=== Season 2 (2012) ===
No. overall	No. in season	Title	Original release date
14	1	"Kiss Or Kill"	June 7, 2012
Murder of Lucy Landry in Pershore; Murder of Mark Stover in Mount Vernon, Washington
15	2	"Hidden Desires"	June 14, 2012
Murder of Stefanie Rabinowitz outside of Philadelphia; Murder of Herman Rockefeller in Melbourne
16	3	"A Toxic Inheritance"	June 21, 2012
Murder of Anne Scripps; Murder of Gracia Morton
17	4	"Sex, Money & Murder"	June 28, 2012
Hans Reiser; Murder of Sara Tokars
18	5	"The Killer Inside"	July 5, 2012
Thanos Papalexis; Murder of George Kogan
19	6	"Death Before Divorce"	July 12, 2012
Murder of Peter Franklin in Bainbridge Township, Ohio; Murder of Karen Sharpe in Wenham, Massachusetts
20	7	"Killer's Smile"	July 19, 2012
Dean Faiello; Sef Gonzales
21	8	"Born to Win"	July 26, 2012
Murder of Robert Kissel; Murder of Andrew Kissel
22	9	"Daddy Dearest"	August 2, 2012
Ed Daou; Osbaston House deaths
23	10	"Moneyed Mysteries"	August 9, 2012
E.C. Mullendore III; Lord Lucan
24	11	"Devils In Disguise"	August 16, 2012
Herb Baumeister; Michael Telling
25	12	"The Price of Love"	August 23, 2012
Murder of Fran Hayes in Charlotte, North Carolina; Murder of Jana Carpenter Koklich in Lakewood, California
26	13	"Family Ties"	August 30, 2012
Newsom family murders; White House Farm murders

=== Season 3 (2013) ===
No. overall	No. in season	Title	Original release date
27	1	"Above Suspicion"	May 23, 2013
Murder of Martha Moxley; Robert Bierenbaum
28	2	"Dark Secrets"	May 30, 2013
Murder of Leann Fletcher in Hazel Park, Michigan; Murder in Boris Kiejliche in Staten Island
29	3	"Mask of Lies"	June 6, 2013
Murder of Peter Porco; Bruce Burrell
30	4	"Flesh & Blood"	June 13, 2013
Murder of Franklin Bradshaw; Murder of Nicholas and Elizabeth Newall
31	5	"Heir to Misfortune"	June 20, 2013
Murder of Diana DeMayo in Detroit; Murder of Nadine Phillips in Kensington
32	6	"Never Enough"	June 27, 2013
Murder of Glen Davis; Murder of Rinette Bergna
33	7	"Kill for Cash"	July 11, 2013
Murder of Robert Wiles in Lakeland, Florida; Chohan family murders
34	8	"A Bankrupt Heart"	July 18, 2013
Murder of Janet March; Murder of Danny Hill
35	9	"Lord and Master"	July 25, 2013
Susan Polk; Steve Nunn
36	10	"Rough Diamonds"	August 8, 2013
Murder of Ted Ammon; Murder of James Joste
37	11	"Spoiled Rotten"	August 15, 2013
Murder of Yeardley Love; Murder of Emily Longley
38	12	"Covet and Kill"	August 22, 2013
Murder of Darlene Roberts near Conyers, Georgia; Murder of John Watson in San Diego
39	13	"Blood Money"	August 29, 2013
Attempted Murder of Heather Grossman in Boca Raton, Florida; Murder of Rozanne Gailiunas in Richardson, Texas
