= Karma is a bitch =

Karma is a bitch may refer to:

== Music ==
- "Karma's a Bitch", a 2024 song by pop and R&B music artist Brit Smith

== Television ==
- "Karma's a Bitch" (9-1-1), season 1, episode 8 of the American procedural series 9-1-1
- "Karma's a Bitch" (Vanderpump Rules), season 6, episode 18 of the American reality television series Vanderpump Rules
- "Karma Is a B...", season 2, episode 5 of the British reality television series The Real Housewives of Cheshire
- Karma's a B*tch, a 2013 American reality television series that aired on Investigation Discovery
