= The Mount School =

The Mount School may refer to:

- The Mount School, Mill Hill, an independent GSA day school in Mill Hill, London, England, for girls aged 3–16
- The Mount School, York, a Quaker independent GSA day and boarding school in York, England, for girls aged 11–18
