= Percival Cyril Hubbard =

British justice of the Supreme Court of Nigeria

Percival Cyril Hubbard (1902 - 1961) was a British expatriate who was a justice at the Supreme Court of Nigeria.

Hubbard was born on 6 April 1902. He was educated at Mill Hill School and Gonville and Caius College, Cambridge. He was called to the bar in 1925 and in 1930, he was appointed Chief Magistrate and legal adviser in the British Solomon Islands. Hubbard transferred to Palestine to become a Chief Magistrate in 1934 and was president of District High Courts, Palestine in 1945. In 1949, he moved to Nigeria to become puisne judge.
