= Cassandra Bankson =

American model and online personality

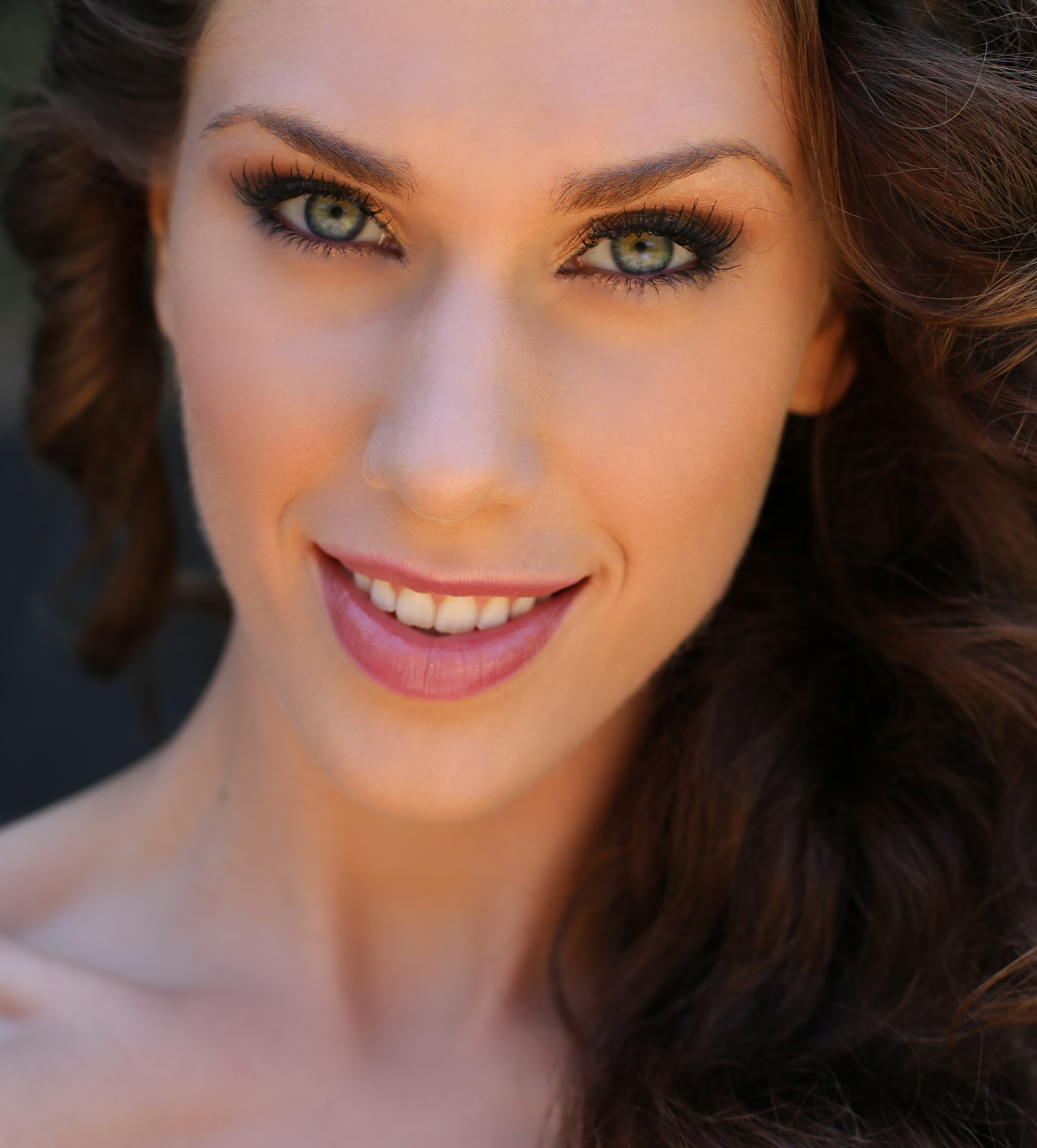
- Born: November 11, 1992 (age 33); San Francisco, California, U.S.
- Occupations: Model, online personality, esthetician

Cassandra Bankson (born November 11, 1992) is an American model, medical aesthetician, and online social media personality from San Francisco, California. She has been featured on Good Morning America, Today, The Doctors, and The Anderson Cooper Show, among other international television shows. She has been featured in magazines and websites including Vogue, Seventeen, Glamour, Forbes, People, In Touch Weekly, Us Weekly, Cosmopolitan, POPSUGAR, First for Women, and the cover of Reveal Magazine and newspapers USA Today, The New York Post, and Pleasanton Weekly.

== Early life ==
Bankson was born to Jennifer and Richard Bankson in San Francisco. She grew up in the affluent suburbs of the San Francisco bay area and was raised in a predominantly Christian household. At age eight, Bankson developed a rather innocuous strain of Acne vulgaris, which later transformed into an aggressive strain of acne conglobata by the time she was fourteen. Eventually her severe skin condition had progressed to the extent that it engulfed her entire face and most of her body. Bankson's parents tried tirelessly to treat their daughter's acne by taking her to 16 different specialists across the United States and western Europe, which proved unsuccessful. Bankson was bullied relentlessly for her severe acne and eventually pulled out of school as a result. She later studied with a private tutor to complete her education. Along with her skin condition, she also has uterus didelphys, a condition wherein she possesses two vaginas, two uteruses, and two cervixes.

== Career ==
=== Modeling ===
Bankson had been working with local professional photographers and model coach Charleston Pierce when she decided to submit professional shots to modeling agencies in San Francisco.

Bankson attended auditions for America's Next Top Model in Blackhawk and Los Angeles, but did not make it to the televised stages. Bankson has modeled for companies including Citizens of Humanity, HP, Davidson and Licht, Farouk Hair Systems, "Guess By Marciano" CHI (with Miss America Contestants and Abel Salazar), Biosilk, Prada, Bebe, along with appearing in other catalogs, magazines, local TV programmes, and runway shows. In April and May 2012, Bankson took part in appearances throughout Sephora stores in partnership with Hourglass Cosmetics.

On September 13, 2012, Bankson walked at the Boy Meets Girl runway show at New York Fashion Week.

=== YouTube ===
In 2010, Bankson began making videos on the YouTube channel "Diamondsandheels14" on topics such as makeup, fashion, and lifestyle. She has since re-branded to "Cassandra Bankson" with a focus on skincare that is both Cruelty Free and Vegan.

The channel's most popular video, titled "Foundation Routine For Flawless Skin Acne Coverage", showing Bankson's bare skin and her secrets to cover her severe acne, gained international attention including that of Right This Minute, Good Morning America, "Anderson", The Today Show, The Insider, MSN, Fox News, and the front page of AOL, Yahoo, and MSN. After posting the video, she didn't look at the comments for four months, afraid of being bullied online. She posted the video hoping it would help "just one person". The video has since gained well over 21 million views. Bankson "made it her mission" to help others with makeup, confidence, acne, and skin conditions online. Her daily videos have also received international press and media attention She is a 'vlogger', and has also posted videos for men who suffer with acne. As of May, 2021, her YouTube channel has over 1.47 million subscribers and 178 million video views. Along with YouTube, Bankson has a large following on other social media sites such as TikTok, Instagram, Facebook, Twitter, and Pinterest. As of May 2021, she has over 230 thousand followers on TikTok and 115 thousand followers on Instagram.

Bankson's story and her popular YouTube video were featured in an episode of Investigation Discovery's Karma's A B*tch.

=== Career milestones ===
Bankson is an Amazon affiliate and hosts weekly livestreams on the platform.

On February 18, 2021, Cassandra was a special guest on the #AskINKEYAskathon, a 4-hour virtual event hosted by skincare brand The Inkey List. This event was dedicated to educating and empowering attendees and answering their skincare questions.

In June 2021, Cassandra served as a brand ambassador for The INKEY List in honor of Acne Awareness Month and led social media discussions about skincare, hosted a Q& A with brand founders, created original video content advising a select group of subscribers on their skincare journeys, and more.

She has been named a “rising woman of power” by Forbes has had frequent guest appearances on The Today Show and has been featured as a 10-year beauty expert on Good Morning America. She has also been dubbed a top TikTok skincare influencer by Cosmopolitan magazine and appeared on a podcast with Dr. Anthony Yuon discussing TikTok skincare trends.

In 2021, Cassandra sat down with notable women in business including Randi Zuckerberg and Melissa Rivers, where she discussed topics ranging from entrepreneurship to mental health struggles.

=== Humanitarian work ===
Bankson has taken her role as an advocate for human rights to the next level as a brand ambassador for Food For Life Global, a charity that provides school children with ethically sourced and nutritionally balanced meals in conjunction with hunger relief programs. She has also partnered with Prabh Aasra (Universal Disabled CareTaker Social Welfare Society), a home in Punjab with a core mission to give unconditional opportunity, treatment/rehabilitation and shelter to those that are struggling with different forms of illness as well as orphaned and abandoned children.

== Personal life ==
Bankson is a plant based.

On April 30, 2018, she came out as a lesbian on her YouTube channel. In her coming out story, she mentions "an obligation to be fully authentic."
