= Nothing Personal (TV series) =

Canadian TV documentary series (2011–2012)

- Genre: Documentary
- Presented by: Steve Schirripa
- Country of origin: Canada
- Original language: English
- No. of seasons: 2
- No. of episodes: 12

Production
- Running time: 60 minutes (with commercials)
- Production companies: Cineflix (NP), Inc.

Original release
- Network: Investigation Discovery; Canal D (French)
- Release: March 9, 2011 – April 20, 2012

Nothing Personal was a television documentary series that presents stories of contract killings. Hosted by actor Steve Schirripa, it aired on Investigation Discovery in the United States, Canada and the United Kingdom. The show is a crime docudrama series that recounts true stories of contract killings. Each episode features a real-life story of a "contract" murder. It explains who was involved, how the crime was committed and the background of the killing.

Nothing Personal has featured episodes about killings with a variety of motives including business disputes, fraud, greed, love and vengeance.

== Episodic information ==
=== Season 1 ===
- Episode 1: The Green Widow - Mary Ellen Samuels beguiles her daughter's fiancé to kill her cinematographer husband, Bob Samuels, then hires a hitman to silence her husband's guilt-stricken killer.
- Episode 2: Popping Champagne - The May 1983 murder of a Colombo crime family member, Larry 'Champagne' Carrozza, by Colombo hitman Salvatore Miciotta.
- Episode 3: Roadside Betrayal - A beloved doctor, Gulam Moonda, is gunned down on the side of an Ohio highway in front of his wife and mother-in-law.
- Episode 4: Blood Ties - enraged by their father's attempt to undermine their family business, two brothers hire hitmen to murder their father and mother on Yom Kippur.
- Episode 5: Young Guns - Rosalio 'Bart' Reta describes his life as a teenaged hitman for the Mexican Los Zetas Cartel.
- Episode 6: Deadly Divorce - Sheila Bellush, a mother of six, is shot dead in a murder-for-hire scheme set in motion by her ex-husband, Allen Blackthorne.

=== Season 2 ===
- Episode 1: Femme Fatale, A former escort who enjoys the high life, Dalia Dippolito hatches a deadly scheme to have her own husband murdered.
- Episode 2: Married To A Rockstar - Todd Garton (played by actor and stuntman Craig Snoyer) an expert manipulator with a vicious streak hatches a sinister plot to murder his wife, Carole Garton.
- Episode 3: Money Shot - Gangster brothers 'Fat' Tony and Joe 'the Whale' Peraino bankroll the classic porn movie Deep Throat. When Joe tries to withhold some of the movie's profits from his brother and the Mafia's Colombo crime family, Tony arranges a contract on his own brother and nephew.
- Episode 4: Turnabout Is Fair Play - Michael Kuhnhausen, a Vietnam vet who can't handle rejection decides to have his estranged wife killed before she can divorce him, but the hitman hired to kill her is the one who ends up dead.
- Episode 5: Beefcake's Revenge - Laurence Austin, the owner of Hollywood's only silent movie theater, becomes worth more dead than alive.
- Episode 6: Voodoo Sex Cult - Mark Foster is the leader of his own voodoo sex cult.
