= Steve Schirripa =

American actor (born 1957)

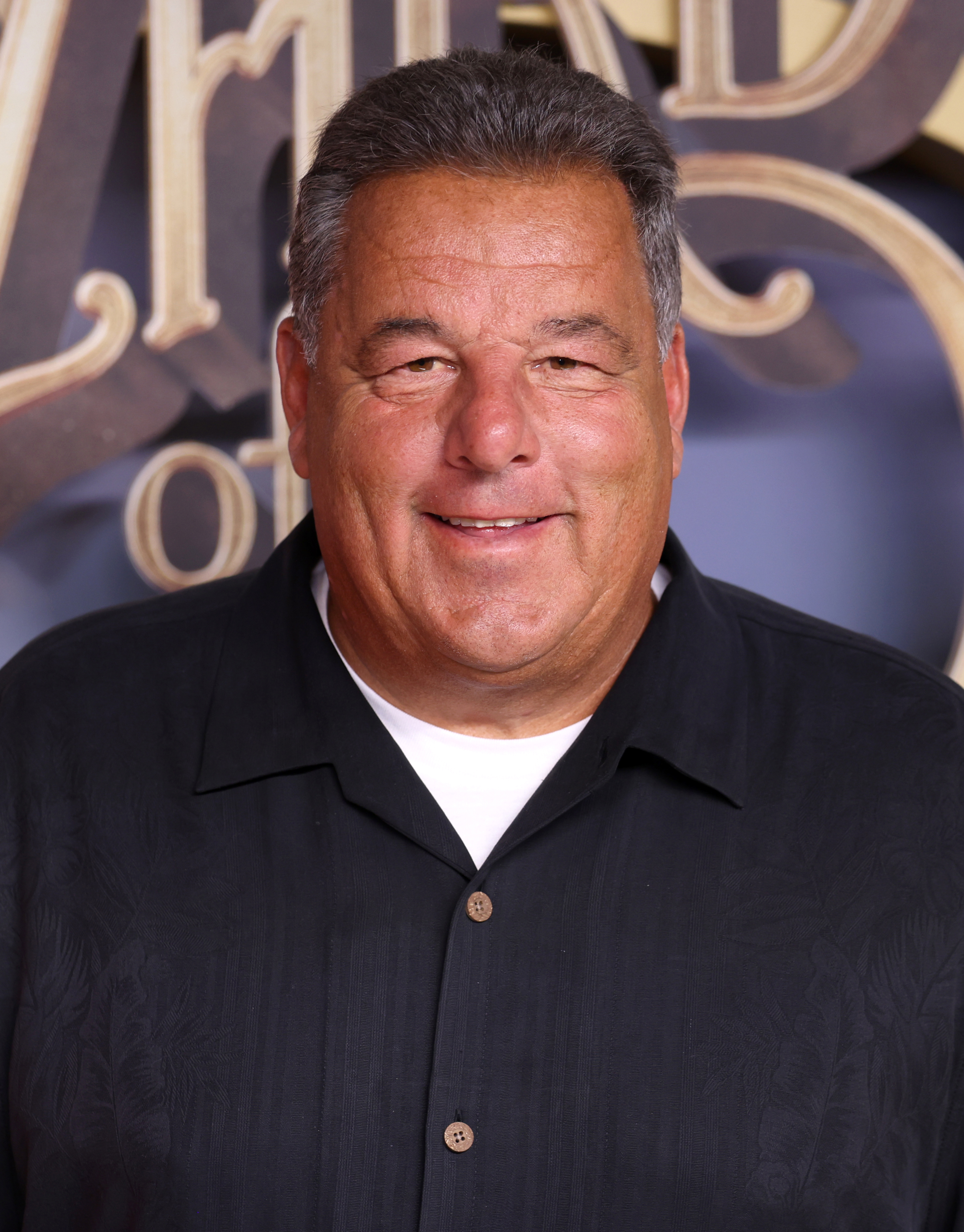
- Schirripa in 2025
- Born: Steven Ralph Schirripa; September 3, 1957 (age 69); New York City, U.S.
- Education: Brooklyn College
- Occupation: Actor
- Years active: 1990–present
- Spouse: Laura Lemos (m. 1989)
- Children: 2

Steven Ralph Schirripa (/ʃɪˈrɪpə/ shih-RIP-ə; Italian: [skirˈriːpa]; born September 3, 1957) is an American actor. He is regularly credited as Steven R. Schirripa, including his total of over 300 total appearances in three long running series, playing: Bobby Bacala on The Sopranos; Leo Boykewich on The Secret Life of the American Teenager; and Detective Anthony Abetemarco on Blue Bloods. Schirripa is the host of two Investigation Discovery series: Karma's a B*tch! and Nothing Personal. He is the voice of Roberto in the Open Season film series.

== Early life ==
Schirripa was born on September 3, 1957 in Bensonhurst, Brooklyn, New York City. His father, Ralph Schirripa, was Italian-American. His grandparents, Ilario Schirripa and Maria Capacci, were from Riace, Calabria, Southern Italy. His mother, Lorraine Schirripa (née Bernstein), was of Jewish descent. Schirripa grew up in a low-income household with four siblings, went to Lafayette High School and graduated from Brooklyn College.

== Career ==
=== Film and television ===
Schirripa got his first taste of show business in his job as entertainment director of the Riviera Hotel and Casino in Las Vegas. In the biography page of his website, Schirripa says that he had cameo appearances in comedy specials by Drew Carey and Kevin Pollak, among other comedians. That led to a role as an uncredited extra in Martin Scorsese's Casino. In the film, he portrayed a customer at the bar in the scene when Joe Pesci's character angrily stabs a man with a pen. After this, Schirripa decided that he wanted to become an actor.

He had several minor roles in films, including The Runner (1999) and Joe Dirt (2001). His breakthrough role was in the second season (2000) of The Sopranos, playing Tony Soprano's mobster brother-in-law Bobby Baccalieri. By chance, he was in New York City in June 1999 for a friend's wedding, and around that time he was invited for an audition in New York City, initially for Agent Skip Lipari, and later for the role of Baccalieri. He played Baccalieri for five seasons, and for the first two seasons he wore a fat suit to fit the role.

His many television appearances include Angel, Casino Cinema, Columbo, Star Trek: Enterprise, Hollywood Squares, Joey, Law & Order, Law & Order: Special Victims Unit, My Wife and Kids, Ed, Jeopardy!, George Lopez, Tim and Eric Awesome Show, Great Job! and The King of Queens. In 2008, Schirripa appeared on CBS's primetime game show Million Dollar Password, and in 2019, Schirripa appeared on the game show Pyramid alongside Jamie-Lynn Sigler. He also made an uncredited appearance along with fellow Soprano star Vincent Pastore on a sixth-season episode of Aqua Teen Hunger Force entitled "She Creature".

Schirripa was a frequent guest on the Don Imus radio program. In February 2007, he began to make appearances for Total Nonstop Action Wrestling, on Spike TV, siding with Team 3D as their cousin in their ongoing battle against The Latin American Xchange. On October 30, 2007, he appeared on, The Podge and Rodge Show. He also did spots as "Steve the Judgmental Bastard" on The Tonight Show with Jay Leno, and taped several episodes of The Gong Show with Dave Attell, as one of the celebrity judges.

From 2008 to 2012, Schirripa had a recurring role in the ABC Family show, The Secret Life of the American Teenager, as Leo Boykewich, Ben's dad.

In 2009, he made a cameo appearance alongside fellow Sopranos actor Frank Vincent in Stargate Atlantis episode "Vegas". He was also in 2009's My Fake Fiancé with Melissa Joan Hart and Joey Lawrence as the Monkey.

He has appeared on the Tonight Show more than 40 times as a guest and as a correspondent. Schirripa hosted NBC's poker game show, Face the Ace, with the premiere episode airing on August 1, 2009. In the fall of 2010, Schirripa had a guest star role in the digital comedy short film, Lil DPC, from writer/director Michael Ratner, which also features rapper Fat Joe and Blink 182's Mark Hoppus.

In 2011 and 2012, Schirripa hosted and narrated the television true-crime series Nothing Personal, which premiered in the US on Investigation Discovery and in the UK on History. The series featured an often humorous take on true stories and reenactments of murders-for-hire. In addition to hosting the hour-long programs, Schirripa was one of the program's executive producers. Subsequently, Schirripa hosted Karma's a B*tch, also for Investigation Discovery.

He has also guest-starred in the American version of Top Gear. Schirripa played Sonny Rosselli in A Poet Long Ago, a short film written by Pete Hamill and directed by Bob Giraldi, which gained entry into a number of film festivals in 2013.

In 2014, Schirripa played Joey on the ABC series Black Box, did voice acting in an episode of American Dad! entitled "Stan Goes on the Pill", and played Vito in the silver screen adaptation Jersey Boys, directed by Clint Eastwood. He will play Father Ed in Chasing Yesterday, a film by writer/director Joseph Pernice, as well as appear in the film Houses by writer/director Jenner Furst, alongside Sopranos co-stars Michael Imperioli and John Ventimiglia.

From 2015 to the show's conclusion, Schirripa played Det. Anthony Abetemarco, an investigator who works with assistant district attorney Erin Reagan on the CBS series Blue Bloods.

In July 2017, Schirripa appeared in a segment on John Oliver's satirical news show Last Week Tonight satirizing Boris Epshteyn and the right-wing tone of mandatory segments given to member stations by the Sinclair Broadcast Group.

Schirripa co-hosted a podcast with Michael Imperioli called Talking Sopranos, which began on April 6, 2020. The two provide inside info as they follow The Sopranos series episode by episode. By September 2020, the podcast had reached over five million downloads. On September 17, 2020, Imperioli and Schirripa signed a deal with HarperCollins book imprint William Morrow and Company to write an oral history of the show; the book titled Woke Up This Morning: The Definitive Oral History of The Sopranos was released on November 2, 2021.

He said in interviews in 2025 that he would be appearing in some episodes of Dexter: Resurrection.

=== Books ===
Schirripa's acting roles often portrayed "goombas", slang for stereotypical Italian-American tough guys and often denoting connections to the Mafia. He carried that persona over into real life but with a comedic twist, especially in appearances on talk and game shows. He expanded on that persona when he wrote a series of books starting with A Goomba's Guide to Life (ISBN 978-1400046393) in 2002. He followed up with The Goomba's Book of Love, co-authored with Charles Fleming in 2003 (ISBN 978-1-4000-5089-5). The series continued with The Goomba Diet: Large and Loving It (ISBN 978-1400054633) in 2006, and in 2013 Big Daddy's Rules: Raising Daughters Is Tougher Than I Look (ISBN 978-1476706344), co-authored by Philip Lerman.

Schirripa and Fleming also collaborated on two books about Nicky Deuce, a suburban teenager who is sent to visit his grandparents in Brooklyn. Nicky Deuce: Welcome to the Family was followed by Nicky Deuce: Home for the Holidays, which was the basis for the 2013 Nickelodeon film Nicky Deuce starring Noah Munck. Nicky Deuce also featured supporting roles filled by James Gandolfini, Michael Imperioli, Tony Sirico, and Vincent Curatola of The Sopranos fame.

In April 2026, Schirripa and Lerman co-authored and released a children's picture book WillieBoy Eats the World (ISBN 978-1636142449) with illustration by Kirk Parrish.

=== Theatre ===
On April 3, 2014, Schirripa gave a theatrical performance in a special production of Guys and Dolls alongside Nathan Lane, Patrick Wilson, and Megan Mullally at Carnegie Hall.

=== Uncle Steve's Italian Specialties ===
In 2014, Schirripa launched a line of organic vegan pasta sauces under the business name of Uncle Steve's Italian Specialties Group. Schirripa appeared on the Eric Andre Show to promote the sauce.

Steve appears at the annual Soupy Fest in Westerly, RI.

== Personal life ==
Schirripa married Laura Lemos on April 22, 1989. They have two children, daughters Bria and Ciara.

When asked if he was bar mitzvahed, Schirripa answered no and stated that he was raised as a Catholic but that he "very much identifies as being Jewish as well".

== Filmography ==
=== Film ===
Year	Title	Role	Notes
1995	Casino	Man In Bar	Uncredited
1997	Highway to Vegas	Bodyguard #1	
1998	Fear and Loathing in Las Vegas	Goon	
1998	Denial	Best Man	
1998	Welcome to Hollywood	Entertainment Director	
1999	Speedway Junky	Security Guard	
1999	The Runner	Host	
1999	Detroit Rock City	Beefy Jerk #2	
1999	The Debtors	The Crapsman	
1999	Play It to the Bone	Party Guest	
2000	The Flintstones in Viva Rock Vegas	Croupier	
2001	See Spot Run	Arliss	
2001	Alex in Wonder	Steve	
2003	Ed	Sandy Buckman	
2003	High Roller: The Stu Ungar Story	Anthony	
2005	Duane Hopwood	Steve	
2005	Must Love Dogs	Vinnie	
2005	Meet the Mobsters	Tony	
2008	Open Season 2	Roberto	Voice
2009	The Hungry Ghosts	Frank	
2009	Jordon Saffron Taste This!	Louie	
2010	Hereafter	Carlo, Cooking Teacher	
2010	Open Season 3	Roberto	Voice
2011	Kill the Irishman	Mike 'Big Mike' Frato	
2013	A Poet Long Ago	Sonny Rosselli	Short film
2014	Jersey Boys	Vito	
2014	Planes: Fire & Rescue	Steve	Voice Cameo
2015	Chasing Yesterday	Father Ed	
2017	Wonder Wheel	Nick	
2020	Love-40	Steve, Security Guard	
2023	Under The Boardwalk	Rocco Marinara	Voice
2025	The Nice Guys	Steve	Short film

=== Television ===
Year	Title	Role	Notes
1993	USA Up All Night	Steve, Riviera Maitre'd	Episode: "State Park/Cavegirl"
1998	Chicago Hope	Security Officer	Episode: "Waging Bull"
1999	The King of Queens	Maitre'd	Episode: "S'ain't Valentine's"
1999	Pensacola: Wings of Gold	Tony	Episode: "Behind Enemy Lines"
1999	Angel	Benny	Episode: "Sense and Sensitivity"
2000	Battery Park	Anthony	2 episodes
2000	Kiss Tomorrow Goodbye	Male Cop	Television film
2000	Big Sound	Russell	Episode: "Pilot"
2000–2007	The Sopranos	Bobby Baccalieri	53 episodes
2001	Black Scorpion	Collector #1	Episode: "Bad Sport"
2002	Monday Night Mayhem	Sal	Television film
2003	Columbo	Freddie	Episode: "Columbo Likes the Nightlife"
2003	George Lopez	Tommy Durango	Episode: "Girl Fight"
2003	Law & Order: Special Victims Unit	Paulie Obregano	Episode: "Tortured"
2003	My Wife and Kids	Insurance Salesman	Episode: "Jury Duty"
2004	Law & Order	Frederico 'Books' Libretti	Episode: "Nowhere Man"
2004	Star Trek: Enterprise	Carmine	2 episodes
2004	Joey	Pit Boss	Episode: "Joey and the Roadtrip"
2004	Guiding Light	Himself	2 episodes
2005	Justice League Unlimited	Cecil	Voice, episode: "Double Date"
2007	Elmo’s Christmas Countdown	Famous Ernie	TV special
2007	TNA Impact!	Himself	Episode dated 22/02/2007
2008	A Muppets Christmas: Letters to Santa	Mobster	Television film
2008	Stargate Atlantis	Poker Player #2	Episode: "Vegas"
2008	Tim and Eric Awesome Show, Great Job!	MyEggs Spokesperson	Episode: "Spagett"
2008–2013	The Secret Life of the American Teenager	Leo Boykewich	113 episodes
2009	Circledrawers	Human Protector	Television film
2009	Ugly Betty	Frankie Burrata	Episode: "Sugar Daddy"
2009	My Fake Fiancé	The Monkey	Television film
2009	Brothers	Louie	3 episodes
2009–2012	Aqua Teen Hunger Force	Dante, Terry's Partner	Voice, 2 episodes
2011–2012	Nothing Personal	Host/Narrator	Documentary series
2012	The Soul Man	Pastor Fanucci	Episode: "The God-Fathers"
2012	Call Me Fitz	Sean, The Gay	3 episodes
2013	Nicky Deuce	Uncle Frankie	Television film; also executive producer
2013	Karma's a B*tch	Host	Documentary series
2014	American Dad!	Bartender	Voice, episode: "Stan Goes on the Pill"
2014	Black Box	Joey Giordano	Episode: "Emotion"
2015	Sirens	Jimmy O'Shea	Episode: "Hypocritical Oath"
2015	Benders	Vito	4 episodes
2015	The Jack and Triumph Show	Himself	Episode: "Sorvino's Pants"
2015–2024	Blue Bloods	Det. Anthony Abetemarco	146 episodes
2016	TripTank	TV Jeff, Boss	Voice, 2 episodes
2016	The Eric Andre Show	Himself	Episode: "Tichina Arnold; Steve Schirripa"
2017	Jeff & Some Aliens	Pawn Shop Man	Voice, episode: "Jeff & Some Energy Trading"
2017	Last Week Tonight with John Oliver	Himself	Episode: "Sinclair Broadcasting Group"
2023	The $100,000 Pyramid	Self - Celebrity Player	Episode: "RuPaul vs Lauren Lapkus and Steve Schirripa vs Loni Love"
2025	Dexter: Resurrection	Vinny Valente	2 episodes
2025	Holiday Touchdown: A Bills Love Story	Frank DeLuca	Television film
2026	Big City Greens	Don Ravioli	Voice, episode "Wise Gals"
