= Murder of Sheila Bellush =

1997 murder in Florida, U.S.

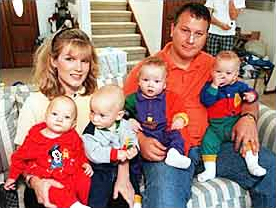
Sheila Bellush with her husband Jamie and her four youngest children

Sheila Bellush was a 35-year-old mother of six who was murdered on November 7, 1997, by a hired gunman named Jose Del Toro, on the orders of her ex-husband, Allen Blackthorne. Blackthorne, who had stalked Bellush since their divorce in 1987, allegedly wanted custody of their two children.

Blackthorne had reportedly been abusive to his prior two wives before allegedly doing the same to Sheila. Suspecting that Blackthorne would kill her one day, Sheila told her sister, "Promise me . . . that if I'm not here, you will find Ann Rule and have her write my story." Rule did in fact write extensively about the case in Every Breath You Take.

== Background ==
Sheila Leigh Walsh was born on October 19, 1962, in Topeka, Kansas. She married Blackthorne in 1982, and had two daughters, Stevie and Daryl. Their divorce was not amicable, with each accusing the other of abusing their children. Sheila married Jamie Bellush in 1993, and had quadruplets two years later. They moved to Sarasota, Florida, to escape the constant surveillance of her ex-husband.

== Murder ==
Blackthorne was unhappy with his divorce from Sheila and began to harass her after she won custody of their children. When the Bellush family moved to Florida, he tracked her down using a private investigator and plotted to hire a man to beat her up. Blackthorne asked Daniel Alex Rocha, a golfing acquaintance with a minor criminal history, for help. Rocha was allegedly motivated to carry out the crime when told by Blackthorne that Sheila was abusing the two children, Stevie and Daryl. Rocha then contacted a friend, Samuel Gonzales, who introduced him to his cousin, Jose Luis Del Toro, who agreed to do the attack for $14,000.

On November 7, 1997, Del Toro traveled to Sarasota in a car registered to his grandmother, with the intention of assaulting Sheila. He stopped at a Sports Authority store to obtain camouflage clothes, and at a gas station for directions to the address Rocha gave. On his way to Bellush's house, Del Toro was spotted by a neighbor who memorized the license plate (this would later lead to his capture). Del Toro continued to the Sarasota home, where he broke in and saw Sheila with the quadruplets. In an interview with police before his conviction, he told them that he saw her with her children and saw how caring she was and almost didn't go through with it. He was about to leave, but Sheila noticed the door was open and then noticed him. Del Toro stated he couldn't run, so he shot Bellush in the face with a .45 caliber gun and slit her throat in full view of the quadruplets. Her body was found a few hours later by 13-year-old Stevie when she returned from school. The quadruplets had been walking around in Sheila's blood, leaving small bloody footprints all over the crime scene. Several of the quadruplets were wearing life vests, which Sheila put on them when she changed one child's diaper to prevent the other children from wandering off unattended and drowning in the backyard pool.

== Aftermath ==
Jose Del Toro fled to Mexico after committing the murder. He was extradited to the US in July 1999, and pleaded guilty to first-degree murder and armed burglary charges in 2000 in Florida. Circuit Judge Paul Logan gave Del Toro two consecutive life sentences, the maximum penalty for both charges. Gonzalez pleaded guilty to conspiracy to commit murder in June 1998 in a plea bargain; he was sentenced to 19 years in prison. Rocha opted to go to trial instead and was convicted of first-degree murder in January 1999 with Gonzalez's testimony; he received a life sentence.

Allen Blackthorne was convicted of federal charges of interstate conspiracy to commit murder and interstate domestic violence. He received two concurrent life sentences without the possibility of parole, starting at the Beaumont, Texas federal prison. In 2001, Blackthorne was nearly killed during an attack by a prison gang, after which he was segregated from the general prison population and eventually transferred to a Florida facility. Blackthorne died aged 59 on November 18, 2014, at the federal prison in Terre Haute, Indiana. The cause of death in the case was not released.

== Portrayals ==
The book Every Breath You Take (ISBN 9780743439749) by Ann Rule is about this case. The case inspired the episode "The Hired Help" of the series Behind Mansion Walls, presented by Investigation Discovery, and a 2002 episode of A&E's American Justice, titled "Brutal Revenge" (since repackaged for The Biography Channel under the series title Notorious). This case was also illustrated in a 2011 episode of the Investigation Discovery Channel series FBI: Criminal Pursuit, titled "Twisted Obsession". In 2015, 48 Hours: Hard Evidence (48 Hours: Mystery/Investigation) on Investigation Discovery released an episode entitled "Justice for Sheila." Investigation Discovery series Nothing Personal: Murder for Hire aired an episode titled "Deadly Divorce" in 2011. In 2021, the Vengeance: Killer Millionaires episode entitled "Cashed Out" covered the case, and in 2023, season 1 of CNBC's true-crime series Blood & Money covered the murder in episode 2, "The Millionaire's Defense."
