= Nicholas Franks =

Nicholas Peter Franks FRS FRSB (born 14 October 1949) has been Professor of Biophysics and Anaesthetics at Imperial College London since 1993. His research focuses on how general anaesthetics act at the cell and molecular levels as well as with neuronal networks. Franks holds patents on use of xenon gas as a neuroprotectant and has published research on the use of the anesthetic properties of xenon.

He was educated at Mill Hill School and King's College London (BSc 1972; PhD 1975). He was a lecturer in biophysics at Imperial College London from 1977 to 1989 and a reader in biophysics from 1989 to 1993.

== Awards and honours ==
Along with being made a Fellow of the Royal Society in 2011, Franks was elected as a Fellow of the Academy of Medical Sciences in 2004, and a Fellow of the Royal College of Anaesthetists in 2008. He was awarded the Gold Medal, Royal College of Anaesthetists in 2003, the Excellence in Research Award, American Society of Anesthesiologists in 2006 and an Honorary Doctorate from the University of Montreal in 2011.

== Selected publications ==
- Franks, N. P.; Lieb, W. R. (1978). "Where do general anaesthetics act?". Nature. 274 (5669): 339–342. doi:10.1038/274339a0.
- Franks, N. P.; Lieb, W. R. (1979). "The structure of lipid bilayers and the effects of general anaesthetics: An X-ray and neutron diffraction study". Journal of Molecular Biology. 133 (4): 469–500. doi:10.1016/0022-2836(79)90403-0.
- Franks, N. P.; Lieb, W. R. (1981). "Is membrane expansion relevant to anaesthesia?". Nature. 292 (5820): 248–251. doi:10.1038/292248a0.
- Franks, N. P.; Lieb, W. R. (1982). "Molecular mechanisms of general anaesthesia". Nature. 300 (5892): 487–493. doi:10.1038/300487a0.
- Franks, N. P.; Lieb, W. R. (1984). "Do general anaesthetics act by competitive binding to specific receptors?". Nature. 310 (5978): 599–601. doi:10.1038/310599a0.
- Franks, N. P.; Lieb, W. R. (1985). "Mapping of general anaesthetic target sites provides a molecular basis for cutoff effects". Nature. 316 (6026): 349–351. doi:10.1038/316349a0.
- Franks, N. P.; Lieb, W. R. (1986). "Partitioning of long-chain alcohols into lipid bilayers: implications for mechanisms of general anesthesia". Proceedings of the National Academy of Sciences. 83 (14): 5116–5120. doi:10.1073/pnas.83.14.5116. PMC 323901.
- Franks, N. P.; Lieb, W. R. (1988). "Volatile general anaesthetics activate a novel neuronal K^{+} current". Nature. 333 (6174): 662–664. doi:10.1038/333662a0.
- Franks, N. P.; Lieb, W. R. (1991). "Stereospecific effects of inhalational general anesthetic optical isomers on nerve ion channels". Science. 254 (5030): 427–430. doi:10.1126/science.1925602.
- Franks, N. P.; Lieb, W. R. (1993). "Selective actions of volatile general anaesthetics at molecular and cellular levels". British Journal of Anaesthesia. 71 (1): 65–76. doi:10.1093/bja/71.1.65.
- Franks, N. P.; Lieb, W. R. (1994). "Molecular and cellular mechanisms of general anaesthesia". Nature. 367 (6464): 607–614. doi:10.1038/367607a0.
- Franks, N. P.; Dickinson, R.; de Sousa, S. L. M.; Hall, A. C.; Lieb, W.R. (1998). "How does xenon produce anaesthesia?". Nature. 396 (6709): 324–324. doi:10.1038/24525.
- de Sousa, S. L. M.; Dickinson, R.; Lieb, W. R.; Franks, N. P. (2000). "Contrasting synaptic actions of the inhalational general anesthetics isoflurane and xenon". Anesthesiology. 92 (4): 1055–1066. doi:10.1097/00000542-200004000-00024.
- Nelson, L. E.; Guo, T. Z.; Lu, J.; Saper, C. B.; Franks, N.P.; Maze, M. (2002). "The sedative component of anesthesia is mediated by GABA_{A} receptors in an endogenous sleep pathway". Nature Neuroscience. 5 (10): 979–984. doi:10.1038/nn913.
- Ma, D.; Wilhelm, S.; Maze, M.; Franks, N. P. (2002). "Neuroprotective and neurotoxic properties of the 'inert' gas, xenon". British Journal of Anaesthesia. 89 (5): 739–746. doi:10.1093/bja/aef258.
- Franks, N. P. (2008). "General anaesthesia: from molecular targets to neuronal pathways of sleep and arousal". Nature Reviews Neuroscience. 9 (5): 370–386. doi:10.1038/nrn2372.
- Zhang, Z.; Ferretti, V.; Güntan, İ.; Moro, A.; Steinberg, E. A.; Ye, Z.; Zecharia, A. Y.; Yu, X.; Vyssotski, A. L.; Brickley, S. G.; Yustos, R.; Pillidge, Z. E.; Harding, E. C.; Wisden, W.; Franks, N. P. (2015). "Neuronal ensembles sufficient for recovery sleep and the sedative actions of α_{2} adrenergic agonists". Nature Neuroscience. 18 (4): 553–561. doi:10.1038/nn.3957. PMC 4836567.
