= The Millionaire's Wife =

2012 book by Cathy Scott

- Author: Cathy Scott
- Language: English
- Genre: True crime, Biography
- Publisher: St. Martin's Press
- Publication date: March 27, 2012
- English publication date: March 2012
- Media type: Print (paperback), eBook
- Pages: 256 pp (Paperback ed)
- ISBN: 0312594356

The Millionaire's Wife: The True Story of a Real Estate Tycoon, his Beautiful Young Mistress, and a Marriage that Ended in Murder, by the author and journalist Cathy Scott, is a true crime account of the 1990 contract murder of George Kogan on an Upper East Side Manhattan street in broad daylight. The book was published for mass-market release by St. Martin's Press True Crime Library in March 2012.

== Synopsis ==
Twenty years after George Kogan's murder, in July 2010, his estranged wife Barbara admitted to hiring a hit man to have her husband gunned down. She was sentenced to 12 to 36 years in prison.

The son of Holocaust survivors, 49-year-old George Kogan grew up in Puerto Rico before relocating to New York City, where he enjoyed success as an antiques and art dealer—until one morning in 1990 when Kogan was approached on the street by a gunman identified by the prosecution as Paul Prosano and killed in cold blood.

Just before the shooting, Kogan had been on the way to his girlfriend's apartment. Mary-Louise Hawkins was 29 years old and had once worked as Kogan's publicist. Kogan and his wife Barbara became estranged, and his wife Barbara became bitter. Barbara and Kogan began negotiations for a divorce, part of which was to be $5,000 per week in alimony. A judge turned down her request.

Barbara, who stood to collect $4.3 million in life insurance, was immediately suspected in Kogan's death. But it would take authorities nearly 20 years to uncover the link between her lawyer, Manuel Martinez, and the hitman. In 2008, Martinez was convicted for the murder of Kogan. In 2010, Barbara pleaded guilty to grand larceny, conspiracy to commit murder, and murder in the first degree.

== Reception ==
The book has remained on Amazon's Top 100 bestseller list in the category of true crime as well as murder and mayhem during its pre-release sales.

The Big Thrill in an April 2012 review of the book and interview with the author, wrote, "Thriller novelists get to make stuff up, but a true crime writer must work with the facts." The article explores "(Scott's) writing process with The Millionaire's Wife and how it compares to authors of thriller fiction."

In July 2011, the author appeared on the "Susan Murphy-Milano Show" to talk about the Kogan case. In June 2012, Investigation Discovery aired a documentary about the Kogan case in its Behind Mansion Walls series titled "The Killer Inside" that included an interview of the author.

The author covered the book in the Forbes.com blog "Crime, She Writes," writing that "the goal with The Millionaire’s Wife was to tell it like it is and get to the bottom of the story."

The book was included in an NBC New York story in October 2013 about a juror in the trial of defendant Manuel Martinez.

== Awards ==
The Millionaire's Wife placed No. 3 in the True Crime Zine reader's poll for the Top 10 Best True Crime Books of 2012.

Crime Magazine included it in its September 2012 "Book ‘Em Vol. 36" issue. It also made Crime Magazine's Books of Note.
