= Dana Ewell =

American triple murderer (born 1971)

- Born: Dana James Ewell; January 28, 1971 (age 55); Sunnyside, California, U.S.
- Relatives: Austin Ewell (grandfather)
- Status: Imprisoned (in protective custody)
- Motive: Familicide for financial gain
- Convictions: 3 life sentences without parole
- Criminal charge: Triple murder
- Accomplices: Joel Patrick Radovcich (the gunman; received same convictions) Ernest Jack Ponce (accessory; granted full immunity)

Details
- Victims: Dale Ewell (father); Glee Ewell (mother); Tiffany Ewell (sister)
- Date: April 19, 1992
- Locations: Fresno, California, U.S.
- Targets: Dale Ewell; Glee Ewell; Tiffany Ewell
- Killed: 3
- Date apprehended: March 2, 1995
- Imprisoned at: Corcoran State Prison

Dana James Ewell (born January 28, 1971) is a convicted American murderer who was sentenced to three life sentences for ordering the killing of his father, mother, and sister in 1992.

== Background ==
Dana Ewell was the younger of two children born to Glee Ethel (née Mitchell) (b. 1935) and Dale Alan Ewell (b. 1932). Dale Ewell was a United States Air Force veteran turned multi-millionaire businessman who specialized in the sale of small airplanes with his company, Western Piper Sales, Inc. Glee Ewell had devoted much of her life to philanthropy and public service, briefly acting as a Spanish translator for the CIA in the 1950s and later holding a seat at the State Bar of California committee that evaluated prospective judges.

Dana Ewell graduated from San Joaquin Memorial High School in 1989. His sister, Tiffany Ann (b. 1967), a few weeks shy of her 25th birthday at the time of her death, was a graduate student, while Dana Ewell himself had earned a finance degree from the Santa Clara University (SCU).

Dana Ewell's parents had substantial investments in the stock market and local farmland. Although the family was financially well off, the elder Ewells lived a relatively modest lifestyle and avoided flaunting their wealth, which was estimated at US$7–8 million (equivalent to $16–18 million in 2025).

During Dana Ewell's time at college, he had been attributing his father Dale's accomplishments to himself, and he was posing as a wealthy entrepreneur when he actually had no business experience. A Santa Clara newspaper and SCU's yearbook both had printed stories on Ewell in 1990, depicting him as "a self-made millionaire” who was enjoying the luxuries afforded by his nonexistent business success. After learning about Ewell's lies, his parents modified their estate plan. Extended family believed that Dale Ewell planned on ending his financial support for his son after his college graduation, a possible motive for the murders. Dana Ewell was pursuing a career in investment banking at the time of the murders.

== Murders ==
Dale, Glee, and Tiffany Ewell were murdered on Sunday, April 19, 1992, in their Fresno home. At the time of the murders, Ewell lived at the family home but was away with his girlfriend for the Easter weekend. The bodies were discovered two days after the murders, when Ewell notified family friends in Sunnyside that he was unable to contact his parents. Glee Ewell was shot four times while Tiffany and Dale Ewell were each shot once.

After the murders, police spent four days at the Ewell home investigating the crime scene. The case was investigated by Fresno County Sheriff's Office homicide detectives John Souza and Chris Curtice. They suspected the killer had been hiding in the house, waiting for the family to return. The murders appeared to have been planned and executed with care. The shooter retrieved the discarded shell casings after firing the fatal gunshots. The shooter's aim was good, as he had missed only one of the multiple shots that were fired. A box of 9mm ammunition, purchased by Dale Ewell in the early 1970s, was found in the home and were believed to have been used to kill the family. The bullets recovered from the victims' bodies showed signs of the gun having been fitted with a homemade silencer. While the home appeared to have been searched for valuables, Detective Souza, who had extensive experience investigating burglaries, concluded the scene had been staged in an attempt to make the murders appear as if the family had interrupted a thief.

== Investigation ==
Police looked into the victims' background and found possible motives for the crime. In the 1970s, Dale Ewell had sold airplanes for a California man named Frank Lambe who had been convicted for drug smuggling, after which Dale took over the business. Dale Ewell had also been involved in a troubled real estate development deal with his brother Ben, which threatened to cost investors millions in losses. Investigation ruled out these factors as possible motives for the murders.

Although Dana Ewell's alibi for the time of the murders included having spent the Easter weekend with his girlfriend and her family in San Francisco, approximately 200 miles away, he became a person of interest after authorities eliminated all possible suspects. Extended family members, like Ewell's uncle, reported that after his family's death, Dana was suspiciously fixated on the details of his parents' will and testament, and was seen "visibly shaken and angry" upon learning he would be unable to access most of his family's wealth until his thirties.

The Ewell’s estate plan included a legal trust to protect most of their assets upon their death. A trustee was required to pay for Dana Ewell's care and expenses until the age of 25, while from 25 to 30 he was to receive dividends from investments, but had no access to the principal. Dana Ewell would receive half the principal at age 30, and the remainder at age 35. However, Ewell was the immediate beneficiary of over US$0.3 million (equivalent to $0.7 million in 2025) in life insurance payments that were not subject to trust restrictions or probate court oversight.

Joel Patrick Radovcich, a college friend of Dana Ewell, abruptly dropped out of college shortly after the murders, and he came under suspicion. Ewell was described as being obsessed with money and social status, and Radovcich was preoccupied with guns and explosives. Ewell had come under suspicion only days after the murders when Detective Curtice had walked Dana through the crime scene, and thought his reactions to the crime scene highly unusual, later recalling his impressions as "that kid's dirty".

Dana and Radovcich attracted additional suspicion by occupying the Ewell family home only a few weeks after the murders. The pair was reported to have made many cash purchases for items such as helicopter flight lessons (despite Radovcich being unemployed) and communicating via a complex system of pagers and pay telephone calls, seemingly designed to avoid being overheard. The police kept Ewell and Radovcich under close surveillance for several months. In one instance, a detective wore a recording device and stood close to Radovcich at a pay phone in May 1993, overhearing him make comments such as "they don't have evidence. They will try to catch you in a lie."

Forensic analysis found the murder weapon was a high-end 9mm specialty rifle manufactured by Feather Industries in Trinidad, Colorado. Company records showed one such rifle had been purchased by Ernest Jack Ponce, a friend of the Radovcich family, shortly before the murders. Ponce admitted buying the rifle for Radovcich, but denied knowing it would be used for a crime. Ponce also concealed evidence after the murders, making him an accessory. He was granted immunity from prosecution and agreed to testify against Ewell and Radovcich, who were arrested on March 2, 1995.

== Trial and conviction ==
James Oppliger and Jeffrey Hammerschmidt of the Fresno County District Attorney's Office prosecuted Ewell and Radovcich in a jury trial that lasted more than eight months. Prosecutors argued that Ewell was motivated by greed, and that he promised Radovcich a share of his family's wealth. Ewell and Radovcich were represented by separate attorneys who took different strategies. Ewell's attorneys, Ernest Kinney, Pete Jones, Mike Castro, and Galatea DeLapp asserted their client was innocent. Radovcich's attorney, Phil Cherney, believing the evidence was so overwhelming against Radovcich that a guilty verdict was probable, made his main goal avoiding the death penalty.

Jurors deliberated for 11 days. Although they considered Ponce's testimony unreliable and suspected he was more involved with the murders than he admitted, they found Ewell and Radovcich both guilty of three counts of first degree murder. The two men were subject to stricter sentencing due to aggravating circumstances: multiple victims, murder for profit, and murder committed by lying in wait. The jury was deadlocked during the sentencing phase of the trial, and the judge declared a penalty phase mistrial. On July 20, 1998, the judge delivered default sentences of life imprisonment without the possibility of parole.

Ewell is in the Protective Housing Unit of California State Prison, Corcoran, along with other murderers requiring isolation from the general prison population.

== Television ==
The case is covered in the Forensic Files episode "Two in a Million" (season 11, episode 40, aired April 18, 2007), The New Detectives episode "Family Plots" (season 5, episode 9, aired January 25, 2000) and the Dominick Dunne's Power, Privilege, and Justice episode "Tailspin" (season 3, episode 5, aired September 5, 2003).

City Confidential ("Fatal Inheritance"), American Justice ("Millions of Reasons to Kill"), and Solved also did episodes on the case. In Ice Cold Blood also aired an episode about the case (“Deadly Greed” season 2, episode 14, aired June 3, 2019).

The series Behind Mansion Walls covered the case in "The Perfect Crime" (season 1, episode 2, aired on June 13, 2011). It is also covered in the It Takes a Killer episode "Spoiled, Rotten, and Ruthless", and the Vengeance: Killer Millionaires episode "Trust Fund Terror."

ABC30 Fresno and ABC Localish Studios co-produced an hour-long documentary film on the Ewell family murders, "Murdered for Millions", which first aired in May 2022. A postscript in the film states that Dana Ewell applied for executive clemency in January 2022.

== See also ==
- Familicide
- List of homicides in California
