= Brian Dugan =

American rapist and serial killer (born 1956)

- Mugshot of Dugan c. 1985
- Born: Brian James Dugan; September 23, 1956 (age 70); Nashua, New Hampshire, U.S.
- Criminal charges: Murder (3 counts); Aggravated criminal sexual assault (4 counts); Aggravated kidnapping Aggravated battery Arson; Burglary (3 counts)
- Penalty: Death; commuted to life imprisonment

Details
- Victims: 3+
- Span of crimes: February 25, 1983 – June 2, 1985
- Country: United States
- State: Illinois
- Date apprehended: June 3, 1985
- Imprisoned at: Pontiac Correctional Center

Brian James Dugan (born September 23, 1956) is an American convicted rapist and serial killer active between 1983 and 1985 in Chicago's western suburbs. He was known for having informally confessed in 1985 to the February 1983 abduction, rape and murder of 10-year-old Jeanine Nicarico of Naperville, Illinois, which was a highly publicized case. He was already in custody for two other rapes and murders, one of a woman in July 1984 and the other a 7-year-old girl in May 1985. He was sentenced to life after pleading guilty to the latter two crimes.

Rolando Cruz and Alejandro Hernandez, both from Aurora, Illinois, had earlier been indicted in the Nicarico case and were convicted of Nicarico's murder in 1983 and sentenced to death. After appeals and new trials, Hernandez was convicted a third time and sentenced to life in prison. Cruz was acquitted in 1995 after a witness recanted testimony, and new DNA evidence was introduced excluding him from that found at the crime scene. State charges against Hernandez were also dismissed that year and he was freed. In 2000, these two and Stephen Buckley received a settlement for wrongful prosecution from DuPage County.

In 2005, Dugan was indicted for Nicarico's murder based on DNA evidence; he pleaded guilty in 2009 and was sentenced to death. After Illinois governor Patrick Quinn signed a new bill to abolish capital punishment in 2011, Dugan's sentence was commuted to life in prison.

== Early life and crimes ==
Brian Dugan was born in 1956 in Nashua, New Hampshire, the second child of James and Genevieve Dugan. He has one sister and three brothers. According to his siblings, their parents were both alcoholics. In 1967, the Dugan family moved to Lisle, Illinois.

According to Dugan's family, the boy's birth had been traumatic. He began to emerge before the attending physician had arrived. The family claims that, in an effort to delay the infant's birth, a nurse and an intern pushed Brian's head back inside his mother and strapped her legs together.

Relatives later questioned if this caused Brian to have brain damage; as a youth he suffered severe headaches followed by vomiting, for which he took medication until his teens. Brian was also a chronic bed wetter, a condition his adult father also suffered from.

Brian showed classic symptoms of psychopathy from an early age. Although he was seen by child specialists, they did not understand the symptoms.

At age 8, Brian and a younger brother burned down the family garage. According to his brother, Steven, at age 13 Brian poured gasoline on a cat and lit it on fire. In 1972, Brian ran away to Iowa, and later that year he was arrested on a burglary charge. It was his first arrest. He was later convicted for other crimes including arson, battery, and other burglaries.

According to his younger brother Steven Dugan, Brian attempted to molest him in 1972 after a stay in a youth home; Steven suspected Brian may have been sexually assaulted there. In 1974, Dugan attempted to abduct a 10-year-old girl from a train station in Lisle. Charges were brought against him but later dropped. In 1975, he threatened to kill his older sister, Hilary, and to "chop up" her son, and he vandalized her car. His brother Steven said that Dugan complained of being sexually abused while serving time in the Menard Correctional Center from 1979 until 1982.

== Murders ==
=== Jeanine Nicarico ===
On February 25, 1983, 10-year-old Jeanine Nicarico (born July 7, 1972) was abducted in broad daylight from her home in Naperville, Illinois. Suffering from the flu, Jeanine had been home alone while her parents were at work and her sisters were at school. Her body was found two days later, six miles from her home. She was found to have been raped and beaten to death.

Rolando Cruz, a 20-year-old gang member from Aurora, became a suspect after offering police false information about the murder in an attempt to claim the $10,000 reward being offered. Soon, police charged Cruz, Alejandro Hernandez (who had accused two others) and Stephen Buckley, with the girl's rape and murder despite limited evidence. The three were tried together by prosecutors. Cruz and Hernandez were convicted in 1985 and sentenced to death; the jury deadlocked on Buckley, and he was not retried.

=== Donna Schnorr ===
On July 15, 1984, Dugan noticed Donna Schnorr, a 27-year-old nurse from Geneva, Illinois, in her car at a stoplight. He followed her and ran her off the road with his car. After getting her out of her car, he beat and raped her. Dugan murdered Schnorr by drowning her in a quarry.

=== Melissa Ackerman ===
In May 1985, Dugan went on a crime spree that culminated with the rape and murder of 7-year-old Melissa Ackerman in early June. On May 6, Dugan abducted and raped 21-year-old Sharon Grajek, in North Aurora; she survived the attack. On May 28, Dugan tried but failed to abduct a 19-year-old woman who was walking along the roadway on the west side of Aurora. The following day, he abducted and raped a 16-year-old girl in the same area.

On June 2, 1985, Melissa Ackerman and her eight-year-old friend, Opal Horton, were riding their bikes in Somonauk, Illinois when they were confronted by Dugan. He grabbed Opal first and threw her into his car, but the girl managed to escape while Dugan was overpowering Melissa. He raped and killed Ackerman, drowning her in a creek more than 15 miles away. Her body was not found for several weeks.

== Arrest and investigation ==
=== Schnorr and Ackerman murders ===
The day following Ackerman's abduction and disappearance, Dugan was arrested at his job. He had come to the attention of the police after a police officer from the neighboring town of Mendota, Illinois reported encountering Dugan about the out-of-date vehicle inspection sticker on his car. After reaching help following her escape from Dugan on June 2, Opal Horton gave the police a description of his vehicle.

Once Ackerman's body was found, Dugan was charged with her murder. Police had linked him to the crime through physical evidence found in his belongings. To avoid risk of the death penalty at trial, Dugan made a plea deal, pleading guilty to murders of both Melissa Ackerman and Donna Schnorr. Brian offered no real explanation for the crimes, stating:

It might have been for the sex, but I don't understand why. I wish I knew why I did a lot of things, but I don't."

He was sentenced to two life terms in prison. In 1987, Dugan survived an attack in which he was stabbed nine times in the arm and chest.

=== Jeanine Nicarico ===
Dugan had not been a suspect in Jeanine Nicarico's murder. In 1985, after being apprehended for the Ackerman and Schnorr murders, he gave an unofficial confession to the crime in what he said should be a deal to avoid risk of the death penalty if the case went to trial. Prosecutors rejected this demand, so Dugan refused to make an official confession. He did plead guilty to the later murders and was sentenced to life in prison.

Dugan later claimed that he confessed in order to take responsibility for the crime and to clear Rolando Cruz and Alejandro Hernandez, who had been indicted for it. Cruz has said that he believes that Dugan's motives were self-serving and had nothing to do with the truth. Cruz was acquitted at his third trial in 1995, after which the State's Attorney also dismissed charges against Hernandez because the evidence and testimony that were the basis of his conviction would be discredited in a third trial.

In 1996, seven DuPage County law enforcement officials: three prosecutors and four sheriff's deputies, were tried but acquitted of conspiring to frame Cruz and Hernandez.

Advances in DNA profiling allowed prosecutors to re-open the Nicarico case against Dugan, as his DNA was found to match that in forensic DNA in semen at the scene. Still in prison, Dugan was indicted in 2005 for the Nicarico murder. In 2009, Dugan pleaded guilty to the murder and was sentenced by a jury to death. Following Illinois's passage in 2011 of a law to abolish the death penalty in the state, Dugan's sentence was commuted to life in prison. He is serving his sentence at the Stateville Correctional Center.

== Possible encounter with John Wayne Gacy ==
In 2008, the Daily Herald reported that Dugan had claimed, since the 1980s, that in 1972, he had been molested as a juvenile by serial killer John Wayne Gacy. Dugan reportedly encountered a man at a Lisle grocery store who offered him a job. Dugan got in the man's car, and the man took him to a secluded area. There he forced Dugan to model bikini brief underwear and perform oral sex on him. The man gave Dugan $20 and returned him to the grocery store where he had picked up the youth.

Dugan claimed that after seeing Gacy's face following Gacy's 1978 arrest, he realized that Gacy was the same man from the grocery store. Gacy prosecutor Terry Sullivan publicly doubted the story. He noted that Dugan did not report the events at the time. He also said that Dugan's account did not match Gacy's typical methods nor was Lisle known as one of Gacy's hunting grounds. However, prosecutor Sullivan said that Dugan did fit the profile of Gacy's victims.

== See also ==
- List of United States death row inmates
- List of serial killers in the United States
