= Thanos Papalexis =

British murderer and developer

Thanos Papalexis (Greek: Θάνος Παπαλέξης; born 23 July 1972 in London) was a previous businessman and property developer of Greek descent who was convicted of murder. In 2000 he murdered a tenant to secure a £2m deal on a London property he owned.

== Business and disputes ==
After leaving Mill Hill School and university, he joined his family's group of shipping companies and led its diversification from shipping and oil trading into real estate.

Papalexis was the head of several real estate investment and hospitality businesses. He created a 200-year landlease format which his companies acquired several properties in Palm Beach, Florida. He is best known for selling properties on such leases at the top of the market, one of which was sold for close to $12m after only 6 months of creating the lease. He was also known for holding separate negotiations with 119 individual unit owners of a hurricane damaged high rise building in West Palm Beach for up to $57m. The deal fell through after the $20m insurance claim the condoboard had represented to Papalexis would be collectable started to become questionable in its value.

Papalexis settled a dispute with Michael Cantor, from whom he had rented an oceanfront estate on Palm Beach. On 15 February 2008 The New York Times reported Cantor as saying, "I'm trying to ascertain the damages" after the property had been used for several lavish parties including a fundraising event with former US President Bill Clinton.

A company of which Papalexis was the founder is suing a leasing company for fraud regarding a luxury jet.

== Murder of Charalambos Christodoulides ==
In March 2000, Charalambos Christodoulides was tortured and beaten to death in a deserted warehouse in Kensal Rise, north-west London before his body was stuffed into an auto mechanic's pit.

At the time of the murder Papalexis had been trying to force through a £2m deal to buy the warehouse where Christodoulides lived and then sell it on for a quick profit in order to prop up another business. However Christodoulides refused to move and, worried about the potential financial consequences, Papalexis had him murdered.

The Times reported on 8 September 2009, that the case against Papalexis was strengthened after a former Miami porn star and £1,750-a-night prostitute stated that he had confessed to the killing. Rebecca DeFalco told US marshals that her former lover told her he had killed a man who was a "problem" and gave her a graphic description of the murder. The victim, a sitting tenant who had lived in the flat for most of his adult life, refused to move out after Papalexis received a £2.3 million offer for the derelict warehouse in Kilburn. The developer was desperate to sell to raise funds to save his ailing business. It was claimed that he ordered hired hands to beat and kill Mr Christodoulides in March 2000.

Papalexis, the son of a Greek shipping operations manager (not a shipowner as Papalexis contended), was found guilty on 4 September 2009 of murder after a three-month trial at the Old Bailey. The jury failed to reach verdicts on murder charges against Robert Baxhija, 29, and Ylli Xhelo, 36, his alleged henchmen, both Albanian illegal immigrants.

Mr Christodoulides's family quickly reported him missing, but although police found blood stains and his glasses in the warehouse, it was not until two weeks later that his body was found in a garage inspection pit in the warehouse complex.

Despite the killing, the warehouse sale fell through and Papalexis was saddled with debts of £8 million. As the receivers moved in, he fled to the US and reinvented himself as a debonair playboy, dressing in Savile Row suits, driving a Bentley and kitting out his office with thrones. He attended parties with America's social elite, including Paris Hilton and the designer Valentino. He invited friends to his beach-front mansion in Florida to join Bill Clinton at a fundraising gala for his wife, Hillary.

After Mr Christodoulides's body was found, the investigation stalled because of a lack of evidence. However, a cigarette stub gathered in the warehouse yielded Papalexis's and, allegedly, his henchmen's DNA. There were also fingerprints on tape used to bind the victim's feet. When the Albanians were arrested they said that Papalexis had asked them to go to the warehouse and forced them at gunpoint to wrap the body. Papalexis was arrested in Palm Beach, Florida, extradited and charged with murder. At the time of his arrest his American business dealings were in turmoil; he was being chased by creditors for $2 million (£1.2 million), including for unpaid rent on his $3 million mansion.

During the trial, he was described as a "classic psychopath" whose gratification in criminal, sexual and aggressive impulses was out of control. He indulged in sadistic sex and hired prostitutes for orgies at his mansion. In his entry on a sadomasochism website, he described himself as "the king of his own realm and all others are to be subjected to his will".

The jury initially failed to reach verdicts on Baxhija and Xhelo, who were both charged with murder. In the subsequent retrial both were found guilty and on 15 February 2010 were sentenced to life imprisonment. Papalexis, who denied the murder, was jailed for life with a minimum of 20 years on 30 September 2009.

== In popular culture ==
A 30-minute television programme called The Playboy Murderer, about Papalexis and the murder, was broadcast in July 2010.
