= Mill Hill School =

Public school in Mill Hill, London

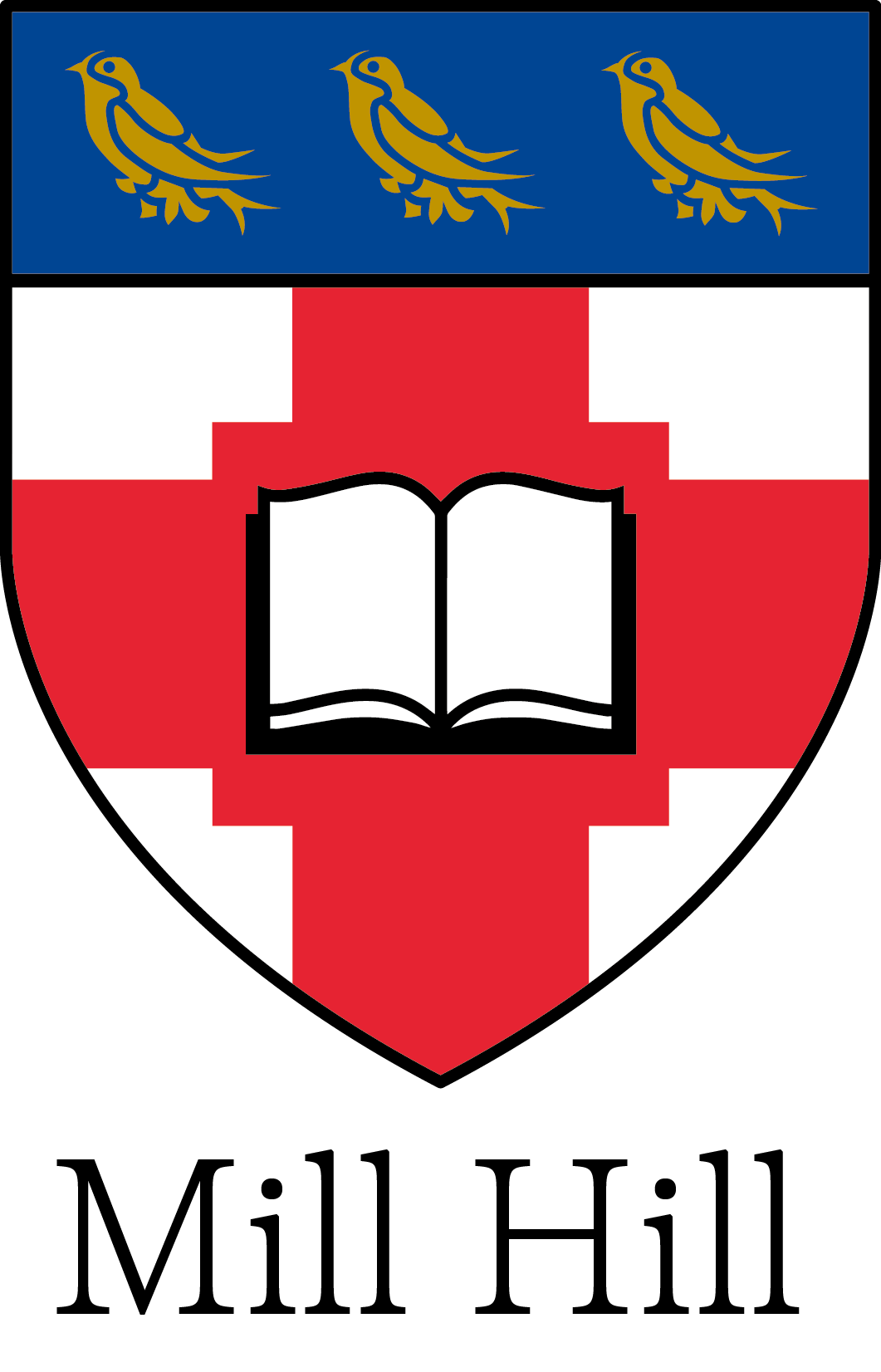

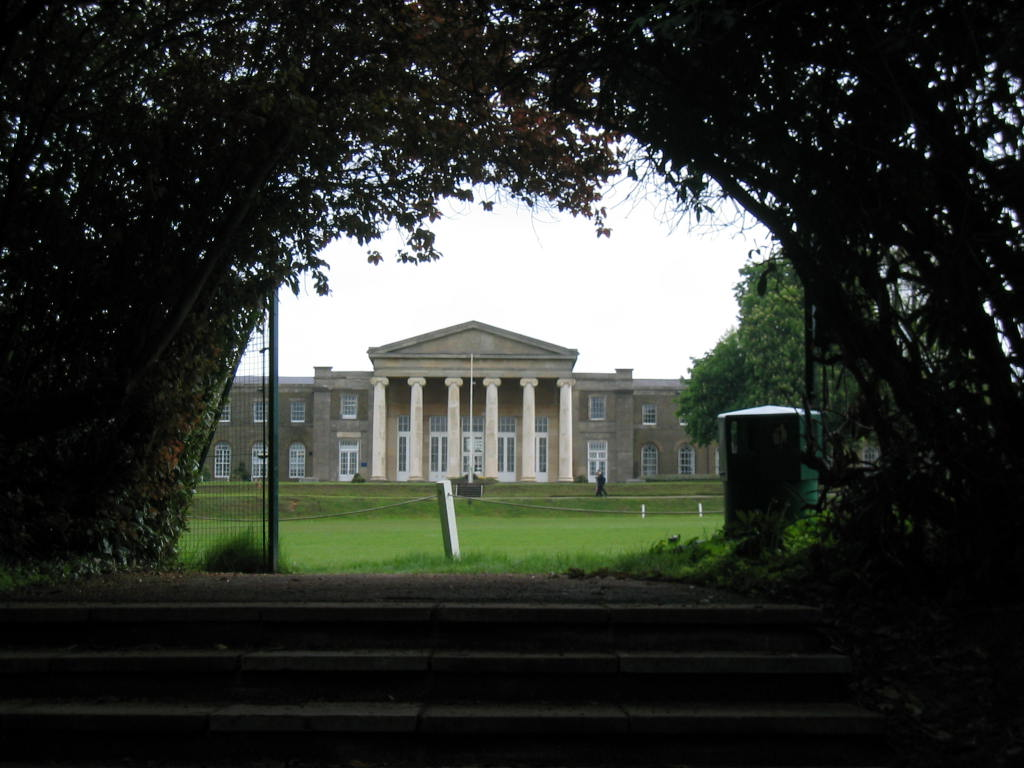

Location
- The Ridgeway, Mill Hill; London, NW7 1QS; England; 51.6190°N 0.2305°W

Information
- Type: Public school Private day and boarding school
- Motto: Latin: Et virtutem et musas (Instilling values, inspiring minds)
- Established: 1807; 219 years ago
- Founders: Committee of Nonconformist merchants and ministers, including John Pye-Smith
- Local authority: Barnet London Borough Council
- Department for Education URN: 101367 Tables
- Chair of Governors: Elliot Lipton
- Head: David Benson
- Gender: Mixed
- Age range: 13–18
- Campus size: 120 acres (49 ha)
- Houses: 12
- Colours: Blue and red
- Affiliation: Headmasters' and Headmistresses' Conference
- Alumni: Old Millhillians
- Website: www.millhill.org.uk

Mill Hill School is a 13–18 co-educational private, day and boarding school in Mill Hill, London, England that was established in 1807. It is a member of the Headmasters' and Headmistresses' Conference.

== History ==
A committee of Nonconformist merchants and ministers, including John Pye-Smith founded the school, originally called Mill Hill Grammar School, for boys on 25 January 1807. They located it sufficiently distant of London at that time, because of "dangers both physical and moral awaiting youth while passing through the streets of a large, crowded and corrupt city". A boarding house was opened in the residence once occupied by Peter Collinson, with about 20 boys. John Atkinson was the first headmaster and chaplain until 1810. (Note: John Atkinson was later head of Wymondley College.)

Mill Hill School occupies a 120-acre (49 ha) site, part of which formed the gardens of Ridgeway House, the house of the botanist Peter Collinson. He was one of the most important importers of rare and exotic plants into English gardens. Many of the species that he introduced to Mill Hill in the 18th century continue to grow today in the grounds of the School. In 1746 Collinson planted Britain's first hydrangea on the grounds, now located adjacent to School House.

The estate was purchased by the botanist Richard Salisbury in 1802, Ridgeway House became the setting for a long-running scientific dispute between the new owner and his guest, James Edward Smith. The flora of Mill Hill was supplemented by the work of the amateur botanist Richard William Bowry Buckland (died 1947), governor of the foundation from 1878 to 1889, who cultivated a garden in the south-west of the school's grounds for the enjoyment of future generations. He wrote in his diary:

In years bygone I pray to thee,
This willow here, my legacy
As I have sat, pray sit thee.
In shaded splendour
Millhillians; rest hither.

— (signed Richard Buckland)

In 1939, Mill Hill School's premises became a hospital. The school was evacuated to St. Bees School in Cumberland for the duration of the Second World War. Collinson House, a school for girls, was named for it. A St Bees Association was founded in commemoration of this period of evacuation in the school's history by Michael Berry and David Smith.

Mill Hill first admitted sixth form girls in 1975 and became fully co-educational in 1997. The BBC news website usually uses a picture taken at Mill Hill School for articles about boarding schools.

In 2005 the school was one of 50 of the country's leading independent schools which were found guilty of running an illegal price-fixing cartel, exposed by The Times. Together they had driven up fees for thousands of parents. Each school was required to pay a nominal penalty of £10,000, and all agreed to make ex-gratia payments totalling three million pounds into a trust. It is to benefit persons who were students at the schools during the cartel period.

In March 2007, Mill Hill celebrated its bicentenary. To mark the occasion, the school was granted a new coat of arms by Robert Noel, Her Majesty's Lancaster Herald.

Patrick Radden Keefe, in The New Yorker, stated that circa the 2010s, the school had "a less academic reputation than its peers". He added that the cost to send a student there was "hefty".

In 2018, the school experienced controversy when it was featured in the music video of London rapper Stefflon Don. In it, she was shown nude in the changing room showers, dancing on tables in classrooms, and smoking marijuana in the dormitories.

== Houses ==
=== Boarding houses ===
- Burton Bank – Named to commemorate its original position on Burton Hole Lane
- Collinson – Named after Peter Collinson, who once owned what is now the estate
- Macgregor – Named after Mary Macgregor, the founder and first head of The Mount, Mill Hill International
- Ridgeway – Peter Collinson's original house on the site

Winterstoke House was converted into Grimsdell Mill Hill Pre-Preparatory School, in 1995.

=== Day houses ===
- Atkinson – Named after the first headmaster, John Atkinson
- Cedars – Named in honour of the cedars planted by Peter Collinson
- McClure – Named after Sir John McClure, headmaster at the turn of the 20th century
- Murray – Named in honour of Sir James Murray, teacher and longtime editor of the Oxford English Dictionary; who began compiling his dictionary while a master at Mill Hill
- Priestley – Named after headmaster Thomas Priestley
- School House – Named after Tite's famous building constructed in the 1820s
- Weymouth – Named after headmaster Richard Weymouth
- Winfield – Named after headmaster William Winfield

== Heads ==
In January 2016, Frances King became the school's first female Head.

The following people have served as Head:

| Name | Tenure |
|---|---|
| John Atkinson | 1807–1810 |
| Maurice Phillips | 1811–1818 |
| John Humphreys | 1819–1825 |
| James Corrie | 1825–1827 |
| George Samuel Evans | 1828 (Note: Evans served as head from January 1828 to June 1828.) |
| Robert Cullen | 1829–1831 |
| H. L. Berry | 1831–1834 |
| Thomas Priestley | 1834–1852 |
| Philip Smith | 1852–1860 |
| William Flavel | 1860–1863 |
| Philip Chapman Barker | 1863–1864 |
| George Donald Bartlet | 1864–1868 |
| Richard Francis Weymouth | 1869–1886 |
| Charles Arthur Vince | 1886–1891 |
| John David McClure (later Sir) | 1891–1922 |
| Maurice Leonard Jacks | 1922–1937 |
| Thomas Kingston Derry | 1938–1940 |
| Arthur Rooker Roberts | 1940–1943 |
| Maurice Leonard Jacks | 1943–1944 |
| John Seldon Whale | 1944–1951 |
| Roy Moore | 1951–1967 |
| Michael Hart | 1967–1974 |
| Alan Fraser Elliot | 1974–1978 |
| William Allan Phimester | 1978–1979 |
| Alastair Carew Graham | 1979–1992 |
| Euan Archibald MacFarlane MacAlpine | 1992–1995 |
| William Winfield | 1995–2007 |
| Dominic Luckett | 2007–2015 |
| Frances King | 2016–2018 |
| Jane Sanchez | 2018–2023 |
| David Benson | 2023– |

== Architecture ==
The chapel was opened in 1896. Designed by Basil Champneys, it is a basilica in form. The School House was designed by Sir William Tite, famous for his work on the London Royal Exchange. The School House was erected in 1825 and is described as being in the Greco-Roman style. Other buildings within the site are of both traditional and modern styling. The cricket house was used as a set in the tenth episode of Inspector Morse. In honour of Patrick Troughton the Mill Hill theatre was dedicated to the actor and named the Patrick Troughton Theatre in 2007.

== The Mill Hill Education Group ==
The school is run by the Mill Hill School Foundation (now known as The Mill Hill Education Group), a registered charity under English law. The Education Group offers education to boys and girls aged 3 to 18 in seven schools. The Mill Hill Education Group's other schools are:

- Belmont – a day school for pupils aged 7 to 13. Head: Susannah Abbott
- Grimsdell – a pre-preparatory day school for pupils aged 3 to 7. Head: Kate Simon
- The Mount, Mill Hill International – a mixed day and boarding school for international pupils aged 11 to 16. Head: Sarah Bellotti
- Cobham Hall – an independent day and boarding school for girls aged 11 to 18. Head: Wendy Barrett
- Lyonsdown – an independent preparatory school for girls aged 3 to 11. Head: Rittu Hall
- Keble Prep – an independent preparatory school for boys and girls aged 4 to 13. Head: Perran Gill
- St Joseph's In The Park – an independent preparatory school for boys and girls aged 2 to 11. Head: Douglas Brown
- Kingshott – an independent co-educational day school in Hitchin for pupils aged 3 to 16. Head: David Weston
- Abbot's Hill – an independent co-educational day school in Hemel Hempstead for pupils aged 3 to 16. Head: Sharon Schanschieff
- Heathfield School – an independent day and boarding school in Ascot for pupils aged 11 to 18; predominantly a girls' school, with a co-educational sixth form. Head: Sarah Wilson
- Westbrook Hay – an independent co-educational day school near Hemel Hempstead for pupils aged 3 to 16. Head: Mark Brain
- 1729 Maths School – a specialist co-educational day and boarding school in Mill Hill for mathematically able pupils aged 11 to 18. Founding Head: Nick Hamshaw
- Mill Hill International School Thailand – a co-educational British international school in Chiang Mai, Thailand, for pupils aged 3 to 18. Founding Head: Kate Simon
- Framlingham College – an independent co-educational day and boarding school in Suffolk for pupils aged 2 to 18. Principal: Louise North
- Pangbourne College – an independent co-educational day and boarding school in Berkshire for pupils aged 11 to 18. Head: Oliver Knight
- St Gabriel's – an independent co-educational day school in Newbury, Berkshire, for pupils aged 6 months to 18. Principal: Ricki Smith
- Tudor Hall – an independent day and boarding school for girls aged 11 to 18 in Banbury, Oxfordshire. Headmistress: Julie Lodrick

== Notable alumni ==
- Nick Auterac, rugby union player
- Ethan Bamber, English county cricketer
- John Batten, physician to Queen Elizabeth II
- Richard Berengarten, poet
- Michael Bishop, Baron Glendonbrook, businessman
- Jasper Britton, actor
- Russell Brain, 1st Baron Brain, neurologist
- David Buck, actor
- Noah Caluori, rugby union player
- Francis Cammaerts, Special Operations Executive (SOE) operative
- James Challis, astronomer
- Ernest Cook, English philanthropist and businessman (grandson of Thomas Cook)
- Chris Corner, producer and songwriter
- Francis Crick, molecular biologist, biophysicist and neuroscientist; Nobel Prize, 1962
- Misha Crosby, director, actor and producer
- Richard Dimbleby, broadcaster
- Sophia Dunkley, international cricketer
- John Richard Easonsmith, officer
- Sir Eric Errington, Bt., British barrister and Conservative Party politician
- Ivor Malcolm Haddon Etherington, mathematician
- David Dayan Fisher, actor
- Seb Fontaine, house music DJ
- Felix Francis, author of the 'Dick Francis' novels
- Nicholas Franks, professor of biophysics and anaesthetics at Imperial College London
- Ben Glassberg, conductor
- Sarvepalli Gopal, Indian historian
- Inglis Gundry, composer, novelist, musicologist, music pedagogue and writer
- Tanika Gupta, playwright and scriptwriter
- Joseph Hardcastle, liberal member of Parliament
- Sir Norman Hartnell, fashion designer
- Hartley Heard, cricketer
- Thomas Helmore, choirmaster and choral historian and writer
- Francis Heron, England footballer and FA Cup winner
- Hubert Heron, England footballer and FA Cup winner
- Stanislav Ianevski, actor
- Chaz Jankel, musician
- Simon Jenkins, newspaper columnist, editor and author
- Robert Evan Kendell, psychiatrist
- Evgeny Lebedev, owner of Independent and Evening Standard newspapers
- Nick Leslau, businessman
- Keith Levene, musician, Public Image Limited
- Tom Lindsay, Rugby Union player
- Malcolm Mackintosh, Special Operations Executive (SOE) operative and intelligence analyst
- Norman Macrae, British journalist, former deputy editor of The Economist
- Ernest Maddox, eye surgeon and inventor of numerous optical instruments such as Maddox rod and Maddox wing
- Bob Marshall-Andrews, politician
- Harry Melling, actor
- Thanos Papalexis, convicted murderer
- Sajith Premadasa, Sri Lankan politician (Leader of the opposition)
- Adam Rossington, Middlesex cricketer
- Paul Sandifer, neurologist
- Vir Sanghvi, journalist, columnist, and talk show host
- Ernest Satow, British scholar, diplomat and Japanologist
- Daniel Sharman, actor
- Henry Shaw, botanist
- Tulip Siddiq, Labour Member of Parliament
- George Spencer-Brown, mathematician
- Roger Spong, international rugby union footballer, England and Great Britain
- Mitchell Symons, journalist and writer
- Sir Denis Thatcher Bt., husband of the former British Prime Minister Margaret Thatcher
- David Tinker, Royal Navy officer killed in the Falklands War
- Lord Toulson, Justice of the Supreme Court
- Patrick Troughton, actor
- Austin Vince, long distance adventure motorcyclist
- Eric A. Walker, Professor Emeritus of Imperial History at the University of Cambridge
- Herbert Ward, explorer, writer and sculptor, whose statue Grief was presented to the school by the artist
- Sir Frank William Wills Kt., architect, surveyor and Lord Mayor of Bristol; member of the Wills tobacco family
- Sir George Alfred Wills Bt. businessman and chairman of Imperial Tobacco
- William Wills, 1st Baron Winterstoke, businessman, Liberal politician, High Sheriff of Bristol & 1st chairman of Imperial Tobacco
- Zac Brettler, a teenager who died in suspicious circumstances in 2019, subject of the book London Falling by Patrick Radden Keefe
