= Helmuth Buxbaum =

German-Canadian convicted murderer (1939–2007)

Helmuth Buxbaum (March 19, 1939 — November 1, 2007) was a multimillionaire owner of a network of nursing homes in Ontario who was convicted in 1986 of the murder of his wife, two years previously. Hanna Buxbaum was found dead on July 5, 1984 on a highway near London, Ontario after having been shot in the head three times. Helmuth Buxbaum had taken out a $1 million life insurance policy on his wife shortly before her murder. The Crown attorney prosecuting the case argued that Buxbaum had hired a hitman to kill his wife for $10,000 and had pulled over to the side of the road so that the man could drag her out of the car and shoot her. The gunman, Gary Foshay, was convicted of second-degree murder. Buxbaum was convicted after a high-profile trial and sentenced to a life sentence without the possibility of parole for 25 years. He died in prison in Kingston, Ontario on November 1, 2007 at the age of 68.

Buxbaum was born in East Prussia grew up in West Germany, the youngest of ten children. His family emigrated to Canada when he was 19 years old.
