= Rolando Cruz case =

American wrongfully convicted for a 1983 murder

Rolando Cruz (born 1963) is an American man known for having been wrongfully convicted and sentenced to death, along with co-defendant Alejandro Hernandez, for the 1983 kidnapping, rape, and murder of 10-year-old Jeanine Nicarico in DuPage County, Illinois. Cruz and Hernandez both became suspects after making detailed reports to the police, which they later claimed to be false, about the murder. Their first trial was jointly in 1987, and their statements were used against each other. A codefendant, Steven Buckley, was acquitted.

After appeals and other court actions, during which they remained in prison on death row, each of these two men was tried twice more. Hernandez was convicted each time and sentenced the last time to life. Cruz was acquitted in 1995 at his third trial after a sheriff's lieutenant recanted previous testimony, and new DNA evidence was introduced excluding Cruz and Hernandez from that found at the crime scene. The state dismissed all charges against Hernandez that same year; he was already serving his sentence in prison. Both men were freed.

In 1996 the state indicted seven DuPage County law enforcement officials for conspiracy to convict Cruz and wrongful prosecution. They were acquitted after the defense presented evidence that Cruz, may have been an accomplice in the murder, as claimed in his confession. Although Dugan claimed he acted alone, none of the multiple sets of fingerprints found at the crime scene belonged to him.

Cruz, Hernandez, and Buckley filed a civil suit against DuPage County. In September 2000, the three men received a settlement from DuPage County for wrongful prosecution and conviction. Cruz was pardoned in 2002 by the Illinois governor after having served more than 12 years in custody on death row.

Another man, Brian Dugan, already convicted of rape and murder of both a child and an adult woman in separate events, had claimed in 1985 to have committed the crime. His DNA was later found to match that from the Nicarico crime scene. Dugan was not indicted until 2005 by a DuPage County grand jury for the crimes against Nicarico, and he pleaded guilty in 2009. He was initially sentenced to death. After Illinois abolished this punishment, his sentence was commuted to life in prison with no possibility of parole.

== Events ==
On February 25, 1983, 10-year-old Jeanine Nicarico (born July 7, 1972) was abducted in broad daylight from her home in Naperville, Illinois. Suffering from the flu, Jeanine had been at home alone while her parents were at work and her sisters were at school. Her body was found 2 days later, six miles from her home. She had been raped and beaten to death.

== Investigation ==
When Rolando Cruz, a 20-year-old known gang member from Aurora, approached the police with purported information about the murder, to claim the $10,000 reward, he became a person of interest because of his fabrications. Several weeks later, Alejandro Hernandez, a high-school dropout also from Aurora, came forward and said that three people had murdered Jeanine and that he knew two of them, Stephen Buckley and "Ricky". Ricky was never identified. Hernandez himself soon became a suspect.

The police took Buckley's boots (which he was wearing the day of the abduction of the girl) to compare with a print found on the front door of the house, which had been kicked in to gain entry. John Gorajczyk, a shoe print examiner in the DuPage County police crime lab, concluded they did not match but never completed a report about this result. Gorajczyk later said that lead prosecutor and Assistant State's Attorney Thomas Knight told him not to discuss the Buckley print not matching, nor the lack of his report. Knight sent the print and boots to the Illinois State Police crime lab, who also did not find a match. He next sent the boots and prints to an expert in Kansas who concluded there was no match. Finally the prosecution submitted the print and boots to Louise Robbins, an anthropologist in North Carolina said to be an expert on footprints. She testified that Buckley's boots matched the print, and that she could identify the height and race of the wearer by it.

Cruz, Hernandez and Buckley were indicted for the abduction, rape and murder of Nicarico on 8 March 1984. After Robbins was discredited in 1986 as an expert witness, the FBI crime lab conducted its own tests. Affirming the reviews by the first three persons above, it concluded that Buckley's boot did not match the print.

There was enormous public and political pressure on the DuPage County State Attorney's office to solve this highly publicized case. The police and prosecutors became convinced of Cruz's guilt. The lead detective, John Sam, resigned in protest before the 1985 trial because he believed that the three men were innocent.

== Prosecution ==
In 1987 the three men—Cruz, Alejandro Hernandez, and Stephen Buckley—were charged with Jeanine's rape and murder despite a dearth of physical and forensic evidence.

At the joint trial of the three young men in 1987, two detectives testified that during an interview on May 9, 1983, Cruz had told them that he had had a vision about the Nicarico murder. He allegedly told them that Jeanine's nose had been broken, that she had been hit in the head so hard that a depression was left in the ground where her body was found, that she had been sodomized, and that she had been left in a farmer's field, all details from the crime that had not been made public. Cruz maintained he had never made the statement. There was no police record of it, and it had not been mentioned during the indictment hearing three years earlier.

Cruz and Hernandez were each convicted, but the jury deadlocked on Buckley. The state did not choose to try him again, and the charges against Buckley were dropped on 5 March 1987. Both Cruz and Hernandez were sentenced to death by the jury.

In November 1985, a man named Brian Dugan, unrelated to any of these defendants, was sentenced to two consecutive life terms without parole for two unrelated rapes and murders (one of a seven-year-old girl and the other of an adult woman) committed in nearby Kane and LaSalle counties. He had pleaded guilty to the crimes to evade the death penalty. While in discussions on the plea deal, Dugan had told his attorney hypothetically that he was solely responsible for the rape and murder of Jeanine Nicarico, in an effort to avoid the death penalty. The prosecution rejected his proposal, as they had not investigated him for this crime, and withheld this information about another suspect (Dugan) having confessed from being introduced at Cruz's trial.

== First appeal ==
The defense appealed the convictions of Cruz and Hernandez. The convictions were overturned on January 19, 1989, due to a prosecutorial error, and remanded to the lower court. The prosecution next tried Cruz and Hernandez separately. The county had accepted Dugan's confession, but rejected his claim of having acted alone since fingerprints that did not belong to Dugan were found at the crime scene. The prosecution maintained that Cruz was the rapist and that he, Dugan, and Hernandez jointly committed the murder.

As in the original trial, the prosecution case rested in part on the likelihood that two shoeprints below a window of the Nicarico home belonged to Hernandez or Cruz. A crime lab technician for the DuPage County Sheriff's office, Paul Sahs, was due to testify to this at their retrials under separate prosecutions. According to Sahs' testimony before the later "DuPage 7" grand jury, he asked the prosecutors to be excused as a witness. Nike officials had told him that the prints were made by a woman's shoe, size 5 1/2 or 6, too small for either Hernandez or Cruz. The prosecutors did not give this information to the defense as required by law. They put Sahs on the stand but did not ask him about shoe size or the sex of the wearer, and the information was not revealed at the trial.

The Illinois Supreme Court upheld Cruz's second conviction and death sentence in February 1990. The Court found that the errors in the trial did not render the trial unfair. Hernandez's second trial ended in a hung jury. When he was tried a third time, the jury found him guilty, but did not reinstate his death sentence. On May 17, 1991, Hernandez was sentenced to 80 years in prison.

== Further appeals and release ==
Cruz appealed again in December 1992, and his second conviction was again upheld by the Illinois Supreme Court. Assistant State's Attorney General Mary Brigid Kenney, who was assigned to defend against Cruz's appeal, sent a memo to Illinois Attorney General Roland Burris identifying her concern about numerous errors in the investigation and trial in Cruz's initial conviction, including "perjured testimony" and "fraudulent investigations by local officials". Burris disputed Kenney's contentions, claiming he could not hold his judgement higher than the jury and that it was his job to uphold a jury's decision. Kenney resigned in protest, claiming, "I was being asked to help execute an innocent man".

In 1994 Cruz's conviction was overturned on appeal. The county chose to retry the case again. During the third trial, a sheriff's lieutenant who had testified regarding Cruz's "vision" at the first trial recanted his previous testimony. He admitted to having testified under oath and said that Cruz had not made the statement. He also said that DNA tests had excluded Cruz and his co-defendant, Alejandro Hernandez, as the contributors of the semen found at the crime scene. The DNA implicated Brian Dugan, who had already confessed to the crime in 1985.

On November 3, 1995, a DuPage County judge acquitted Cruz on the basis of the recanted testimony, the DNA evidence, and the lack of any substantiated evidence against the defendant. In December 1995, the charges against Hernandez, who had been serving time in prison, were dismissed by the State's Attorney.

== Trial and acquittal of the investigators ==
Following a grand jury proceeding, the DuPage County State's Attorney office indicted seven DuPage County law enforcement officials, Thomas Knight and two other prosecutors, and four sheriff's deputies, in December 1996 on 47 charges of conspiracy to convict Cruz despite being aware of exculpatory evidence. They were charged with perjury and obstruction of justice.

The indictment rested on two main points. The first was that two detectives had testified that Cruz had told them that he had had a "vision" of the murder that contained details known only to the killer. This material was never recorded or included in any police report but was "endorsed and perpetuated by the prosecutors." Secondly, they said prosecutors had concealed Brian Dugan's confession while knowing that it included accurate, private details related to the crimes, which indicated that he had committed the deeds. In April 1999, the trial of the "DuPage Seven" began. All seven officials were ultimately acquitted.

The defendants were acquitted after presenting evidence that Cruz's confession may have actually been truthful. The judge instructed the jury that DNA evidence could not be conclusory about whether the crime was committed by one person. According to Cruz's confession, he did not rape or murder Jeanine Nicarico. He was involved in the burglary and present during the kidnapping. Cruz and Dugan lived on the same block at the time of the murder.

Chicago police investigator Paul Heinlein testified that Cruz had confessed to being an accomplice in the murder. Heinlein said he was at a party when a waitress summoned him and two other officers to a bar because Cruz was talking about the case. Heinlein said Cruz was crying and told him that he hadn't hurt the girl, but that "white boy" had done "those things" (Brian Dugan is white). Heinlein's testimony was similar to that of a fellow inmate and an acquaintance of Cruz, both of whom testified that Cruz had confessed to being involved in the murder, but not to being the actual murderer.

According to Heinlein, Cruz said he had been part of a team of burglars that broke into the home and that they had found the girl hiding in a corner upstairs. He said "white boy" had raped her in the bedroom, hit her with a baseball bat, wrapped her in a sheet, and kicked her down the stairs.

As for how he was able to give a detailed description of the crime scene, Cruz claimed that he had learned the details from the detectives themselves, whom he said had discussed the case in his presence.

According to the Chicago Tribune in 2007, the case against the DuPage law enforcement officials established a legal benchmark in getting to trial, as it is highly unusual for prosecutors to be prosecuted for their actions in office. Since 1966, there had been 381 homicide convictions in the United States reversed on the grounds that prosecutors knowingly used false evidence or withheld evidence suggesting innocence. Of these, 46 were tried in Illinois, which had the second-highest total and twice as many as the state that ranked third. Only two of those cases resulted in later indictments of prosecutors, and both were dismissed before trial.

== Aftermath ==
In 2000, Cruz, Hernandez, and Buckley received a settlement from DuPage County for their imprisonment. In 2002, Cruz was fully pardoned by Governor George Ryan.

In November 2005, Dugan was indicted for the Nicarico murder. On July 28, 2009, 52-year-old Dugan pleaded guilty. His 1985 confession was made public for the first time on October 14.

On October 7, 2009, the jury determined Dugan was eligible for the death penalty, which under state law required that he qualify by at least one of four conditions: that the victim was younger than 12, the crime was exceptionally brutal and heinous, a previous conviction for at least one other murder, or that the crime was committed during the course of another felony. He qualified on all four counts.

The public outcry from the Cruz case resulted in Governor George Ryan declaring a moratorium on the death penalty in Illinois, asserting that the system was "fraught with error."

On March 9, 2011, Illinois Governor Pat Quinn signed legislation abolishing the death penalty in Illinois, making it law.

== See also ==
- List of wrongful convictions in the United States
