= Murder of Jeanine Nicarico =

1983 child murder in Illinois, U.S.

Jeanine Nicarico
- Born: July 7, 1972; Naperville, Illinois, U.S.
- Died: February 25, 1983 (aged 10); Naperville, Illinois, U.S.
- Cause of death: Homicide
- Known for: Murder victim

The Jeanine Nicarico murder case was a complex and influential homicide investigation and prosecution in which two men, Rolando Cruz and Alejandro Hernandez, were wrongfully convicted of abduction, rape and murder in 1985 in DuPage County, Illinois. They were both sentenced to death. The case was scrutinized during appeals for being weak in evidence.

After appeals, one man was acquitted in 1995 at his third trial at which a witness recanted previous testimony and new DNA evidence was introduced; the second man, already serving time after being twice convicted, had his charges dismissed by the Illinois State's Attorney. The notoriety of the case and the serious possibility that two innocent men could have been executed was an influence on Governor George H. Ryan's decision in 2000 to impose a death penalty moratorium in the state.

The state indicted seven law enforcement officials for wrongful prosecution of the Nicarico case, saying they had illegally conspired against Cruz in an effort to convict him. The three prosecutors and four sheriff's deputies were ultimately acquitted in 1999.

In 2005, serial killer Brian Dugan was indicted on charges for the crimes against Nicarico. He entered a plea of guilty in September 2009 to the murder of Nicarico after having previously confessed to the crime. He was already serving a life sentence on two other, unrelated rape and murder charges, one of a 27-year-old woman and the other of a seven-year-old girl, Melissa Ackerman from Somonauk, Illinois. (Still another girl had escaped at the time.) On November 11, 2009, after deliberating about 10 hours over two days, a DuPage County jury sentenced Brian Dugan to death for the rape and murder of Jeanine Nicarico 26 years earlier. Dugan's sentence was commuted to life in prison after Illinois passed a law in 2011 abolishing the death penalty.

== Abduction, rape and murder ==
Jeanine Nicarico was born July 7, 1972, in Naperville, Illinois, to Tom and Pat Nicarico. She had two sisters.

On February 25, 1983, before the family returned home that day, Nicarico was abducted from the house after an intruder entered and burgled it. She is believed to have been raped and murdered the same day.

Her body was found two days later along the Illinois Prairie Path near Eola Road. She was determined to have been raped and sodomized before she was killed.

== Prosecution of Cruz, Hernandez, and Buckley ==
Rolando Cruz, Alejandro Hernandez and Stephen Buckley were indicted in March 1984. A joint trial was held; in February 1985, Cruz and Hernandez were convicted, but the jury deadlocked on Buckley. The next month, both Cruz and Hernandez were sentenced to death.

In November 1985, Brian Dugan, who was already in jail and being tried for the rape and murder of a seven-year-old girl and of a 27-year-old woman in separate events, confessed to the crimes against Nicarico through his attorney. Dugan plea-bargained his charges in the two murders for which he had been apprehended to life imprisonment.

In 1987, the charges against Buckley were dismissed by a judge.

On January 19, 1988, the Illinois Supreme Court struck down the convictions of Cruz and Hernandez because the two were not tried separately. Both were retried despite public pressure on the DuPage County State's Attorney's office to investigate the Dugan confession. Cruz was convicted in his second trial in February 1990. The second trial of Hernandez ended in a hung jury in May 1990. He was convicted at his third trial, and was sentenced to 80 years in prison on May 17, 1991.

Meanwhile, Cruz had appealed. In December 1992, his second conviction was upheld by the Illinois Supreme Court in a 4-3 decision.. Shortly after that decision three of the seven judges left the court, and in May 1993 the newly comprised court agreed to rehear the case. On July 14, 1994, Cruz was granted a third trial. The court was again divided 4-3, but two of the three new judges voted for reversal, flipping the result.

The Illinois Appellate Court overturned the second conviction of Hernandez on January 30, 1995.

During Cruz's third trial, a sheriff's lieutenant reversed his testimony, and introduced new information, including that new testing of the DNA of both Cruz and Hernandez had excluded each as matching that in semen evidence at the crime scene. Cruz was acquitted in November 1995. A state investigator was appointed to review the recanted testimony. In December 1995, the State's Attorney dismissed all charges against Hernandez and he was released from jail.

== Aftermath ==
In December 1996 the state indicted seven DuPage County law enforcement officials: three prosecutors and four sheriff's deputies, on charges of "lying and fabricating evidence against Cruz"; formally they were charged with conspiracy to convict Cruz despite being aware of exculpatory evidence. After numerous court proceedings, by June 1999 all seven had been acquitted of the charges.

Cruz, Hernandez and Buckley filed a civil suit for wrongful prosecution against DuPage County. They were awarded a $3.5 million civil settlement on September 26, 2000.

In 2002, Governor George Ryan granted Cruz a pardon. Based in part on the notoriety of this case and Cruz's acquittal, in 2003 Ryan imposed a moratorium on executions in the state, and commuted the sentences to life of 167 persons on death row.

It was not until November 2005 that Dugan was indicted for the Nicarico abduction, rape, and murder. Initially he refused to plead in court, and the judge entered a "Not guilty" plea for him in 2006 when the trial opened. On July 22, 2009, Dugan pleaded guilty to rape and murder of Nicarico. On November 11, 2009, he was sentenced to death by vote of the jury. On December 16, 2009 the judge set the execution date for February 25, 2010. After the death penalty was abolished in Illinois in 2011 by passage of a new law, Dugan's sentence was commuted to life in prison without possibility of parole (LWOP).

== See also ==
- List of homicides in Illinois
- Kidnapped American children
- Child murder in the United States
