= The Mount, Mill Hill International =

Mill Hill International

Location
- Milespit Hill; Mill Hill, London, NW7 2RX; England; 51.615352°N 0.224966°W

Information
- Type: Private boarding and day school
- Motto: Instilling values, inspiring minds
- Established: 2015
- Head teacher: Sarah Bellotti
- Gender: Co-Educated
- Age: 13 to 18
- Houses: Collinson, Ridgeway, Burton Bank, McGregor, and Oak House (Day)
- Website: http://www.millhill.org.uk/international

Mill Hill International is a coeducational independent day and boarding school located in Mill Hill, North London and forms part of the Mill Hill School Foundation, close to the main Mill Hill School site.

Boarding houses are shared with Mill Hill pupils, and the international pupils have full use of the Senior School’s facilities.

In December 2013 The Mount merged with the Mill Hill School Foundation (now known as 'The Mill Hill Education Group'). A £4,000,000 renovation project involved the complete refurbishment of all classrooms, the re-landscaping of the grounds, the updating of the science facilities and a new IT and food technology suite.

Until July 2014, the school was an independent GSA day school for girls aged 3–16. It had been founded with 10 pupils in 1925 by Mary McGregor in North Grove, Highgate Village. The number of pupils increased gradually and in 1935 it relocated to Mill Hill.

In 2015 The Mount was renamed Mill Hill International, offering a day and boarding school for International pupils aged 13–16.

In June 2025, Mill Hill International celebrated its 10th anniversary. The head, Sarah Bellotti, announced the opening of MHI Sixth Form for pupils aged 17–18.

In September 2025, Mill Hill International opened its sixth form course and built a new sixth form centre.

== Heads ==
- 1925: Mary McGregor
- 1963: Betty Shannon Millin
- 1973: Margaret Pond
- 1998: Mrs J Kirsten Jackson
- 2008: Ms Catherine Cozens
- 2015: Ms Sarah Bellotti

== Alumni ==
Famous alumni include actress Daisy Edgar-Jones and singer Amy Winehouse.
