= Karma's a B*tch =

2013 television series

Karma's a B*tch is a television series that aired on Investigation Discovery (ID) in 2013. Hosted by Steve Schirripa, the show tells stories of victims seeking revenge against those who have wronged them, such as bullies, ex-lovers, criminals/con-artists, even businesses. Others such as Cassandra Bankson tell how they managed to get revenge by simply becoming successful in life.
