= List of The New Detectives episodes =

This is an episode listing for the Discovery Channel Television show The New Detectives, with the episodes' original air date included, if available.

== Series overview ==
Season	Episodes	Originally released	
Season	Episodes	First released	Last released
1	3	June 10, 1996	June 12, 1996
2	13	April 22, 1997	July 15, 1997
3	10	December 2, 1997	February 10, 1998
4	15	November 24, 1998	May 18, 1999
5	13	October 5, 1999	April 4, 2000
6	13	October 10, 2000	September 11, 2001
7	18	September 18, 2001	September 24, 2002
8	18	October 15, 2002	January 3, 2004
9	18	October 28, 2003	October 31, 2004

== Episodes ==
=== Season 1 (1996) ===
No. overall	No. in season	Title	Original release date
1	1	"Soldier Stories"	June 10, 1996
Uncovering the secrets of the young men who went to war and never came back.
2	2	"Dead Men Do Talk"	June 11, 1996
Examining the case of Danny Webster, and identifying the remains of the Fairfax County Jane Doe with the help of Douglas W. Owsley and William R. Maples.
3	3	"Deadly Chemistry"	June 12, 1996
Exploring the deadly poisoning cases by Lee Roy Hargrave, Stella Nickell, and Joseph Meling.

=== Season 2 (1997) ===
No. overall	No. in season	Title	Original release date
4	1	"Mind Hunters"	April 22, 1997
How psychological profiling was used to catch and examine the minds of Richard Chase, John Wayne Gacy and Mike DeBardeleben.
5	2	"Camera Clues"	April 29, 1997
How crime scene photos can provide valuable clues during an investigation.
6	3	"Double Helix"	May 6, 1997
Examining the cases of Lynn Breeden and Peggy Laughlin, and the important role DNA played in solving them.
7	4	"Web of Clues"	May 13, 1997
The cases of Roxanne Tandal, Michelle Denise Anderson and the mysterious deaths of three elderly people are solved through Forensic entomology.
8	5	"Faces of Tragedy"	May 20, 1997
Forensic sculptors use skulls and clay to create models of victims' faces. Includes the murder of Belinda Tillery, the search for John List, and the disappearance of Donna Martin.
9	6	"Without a Trace"	May 27, 1997
Missing person cases of Rikki Ellsworth, Henry Campbell, and Lisa Tsu are examined.
10	7	"Burning Evidence"	June 3, 1997
How forensics can find clues even in charred remains.
11	8	"Short Fuse"	June 10, 1997
Bombing cases involving mailed packages, are examined. Cases like Michael Stevens and Steve Benson.
12	9	"Death Grip"	June 17, 1997
How the crimes of Bryan Maurice Jones and the cases of Thora Rose and Glenn Michelson were solved through fingerprint identification.
13	10	"Signed in Blood"	June 24, 1997
Handwriting analysis is used to determine mood, motive, and many other psychological traits. Join forensics experts and criminal investigators to solve the case.
14	11	"Witness to Terror"	July 1, 1997
Examining the plane crashes of American Eagle Flight 4184 and Skylink Airlines Flight 070.
15	12	"Trial of the Century"	July 8, 1997
The O. J. Simpson murder trial is examined.
16	13	"Deadly Target"	July 15, 1997
Ballistics is used to solve a 4th of July killing in Bloomingdale, Illinois, the murder of Fred Hampton, and a New Orleans drive-by shooting that killed a young boy.

=== Season 3 (1997–98) ===
No. overall	No. in season	Title	Original release date
17	1	"Fatal Compulsion"	December 2, 1997
Psychology is used to determine the motives of Ted Bundy, Paul Bernardo, and Aileen Wuornos.
18	2	"Bodies of Evidence"	December 9, 1997
Forensic scientists attempt to build a murder case without the body of Helle Crafts, Ava Marie DeHart, and Eric Humbert.
19	3	"Shreds of Evidence"	December 16, 1997
Hair and fiber evidence helps unravel the crimes of Wayne Williams, and solve the cases of Lisa Garland and Michael Mannella.
20	4	"Seeds of Destruction"	December 30, 1997
Botany and geology are used to examine the deaths of Denise Johnson, Kendra Hutter; and Cher Elder.
21	5	"Lethal Dosage"	January 6, 1998
Toxicologists examine the crimes of Judy Buenoano and George Trepal; and the death of Gloria Ramirez.
22	6	"Tools of Death"	January 13, 1998
A tool used to commit a crime can often be the same tool used to solve it. The pattern a machine leaves on an item or the unusual way a tool crimps can lead to the killer, like Danny Rolling.
23	7	"Out of the Grave"	January 20, 1998
New forensic techniques are used to solve the murder of Deana Jalynn Hubbard at Big Sur, and Susan Davis in Columbia, Missouri. At the Royal Ontario Museum scientist examines an ancient mummy.
24	8	"Infallible Witness"	January 27, 1998
New technology is used to solve the murder of Dawn Fehring, the crimes committed by Archie Woods, and the examination of brain fingerprinting as a future forensic tool.
25	9	"From the Ashes"	February 3, 1998
In Pittsburgh three firefighters die in the line of duty. Baltimore police investigate a series of arson cases. In Reno, Nevada detectives try to uncover the cause of a blaze.
26	10	"Living in Terror"	February 10, 1998
The bombing sprees of Walter Leroy Moody and Dean Harvey Hicks are examined.

=== Season 4 (1998–99) ===
No. overall	No. in season	Title	Original release date
27	1	"Lethal Obsession"	November 24, 1998
Blind ambition, rage, and desire can lead to unspeakable acts. Such as the murder of Linda Sobek, Randall Woodfield, or the double murder committed by Jens Söring.
28	2	"Traces of Guilt"	November 17, 1998
The criminals David Stephen Middleton, Walter Nyhuis and Jeffrey Russell are convicted through the examination of tiny particles.
29	3	"Electronic Witness"	December 29, 1998
A look at the triple homicide committed by Oba Chandler and the murders of Lori Auker and Julie Snodgrass.
30	4	"Dead Wrong"	December 8, 1998
The cases of quadruple homicide committed by Earl Bramblett, the murder of Stefanie Rabinowitz and the death of Pam Mintz.
31	5	"Lasting Impressions"	December 1, 1998
Following how the police caught Richard Ramirez, and solved the murder of Susan Helm in Des Moines, Iowa.
32	6	"Women Who Kill"	January 26, 1999
The female culprits Barbara Stager, Blanche Taylor Moore and Sylvia White are examined.
33	7	"Deadly Dealings"	December 15, 1998
Hire-to-kill cases are examined, including the murders of Gerald and Vera Woodman.
34	8	"Body Count"	December 22, 1998
A look into the Hillside Strangler murders, David Carpenter and Larry Eyler.
35	9	"A Taste of Poison"	February 2, 1999
A serial poisoner is on the loose in San Angelo, Texas. Investigators in St. Peters, Missouri suspect a husband's sudden death wasn’t natural.
36	10	"Grave Discoveries"	March 23, 1999
Forensic scientists reevaluate the unsolved cases of Sam Sheppard, Martin Frias and Walter Scott by applying new methods.
37	11	"Texas Rangers"	March 30, 1999
Murder cases solved by the Texas Rangers are examined.
38	12	"Bad Medicine"	April 6, 1999
Investigators on a supposed drug overdose believe the victim's husband, Lowell Amos, is responsible. Cyanide in a water cooler killed an office worker in Tempe, Arizona.
39	13	"Unlikely Sources"	April 13, 1999
Some of the most important clues come from the least likely places. Examining the murders of Virginia Russell in Columbia, South Carolina, Hye-Yon Smith in Muskegon, Michigan and Janet Overton in Dana Point, California.
40	14	"True Crime"	April 27, 1999
Telling the stories of the 1996 shooting of Dr. Darryl Sutorius; the 1978 murder of Karla Brown and the 1993 murder of Jerry Boggs.
41	15	"Coroner's Casebook"	May 18, 1999
Cyril Wecht, Michael Baden and Henry Lee, three of the country's most respected coroners, share their cases and insights into crime solving. Like the case of Richard Boggs.

=== Season 5 (1999–2000) ===
No. overall	No. in season	Title	Original release date
42	1	"Remnant of Blame"	October 5, 1999
The way forensic scientists use their vision to evaluate small items from crime scenes is examined. Featured cases: The 1993 murder of Emogene Thompson, the 1992 murder of Cecilia Reyes, and the 1990 murder of Rebecca Forbes.
43	2	"Partners in Crime"	December 26, 1999
There's an old saying that a burden shared is a burden halved. But when people team up to commit murder, investigators must rely on forensic science to capture killer duos like Ray and Faye Copeland.
44	3	"Scattered Clues"	October 19, 1999
Murder cases are solved by examining clues left by the perpetrator. Examines the murders of Darcie Frackenpohl, Laura Houghteling, and Marjorie Sessions.
45	4	"Natural Witness"	November 2, 1999
Murder cases located in outdoor places are examined. Featured cases: Margie Davidson in Ventura, California, Molly McClure in Seattle and Rhoda Nathan in Blue Ash, Ohio.
46	5	"Tainted Trust"	November 16, 1999
The crimes and convictions of Audrey Marie Hilley, David Dowler, and Georgia Louise Weaver.
47	6	"Presumed Dead"	December 14, 1999
Murder cases where no body was found. Examines the crimes of Richard Grissom, the murders of Karen Sherrier in Elizabeth, New Jersey and Pearl Burns in Portland, Maine.
48	7	"Broken Vow"	December 21, 1999
The murders of Becky Vargas in Ogden, Utah and Wanda Cowger Kuzmichev in Boise, Idaho.
49	8	"Cold Cases"	January 11, 2000
The abduction of Denise Huber, the Christmas murder of Dean Phillips, and the 1989 murder of Nikia Gilbreath are solved after years of investigation.
50	9	"Family Plots"	January 25, 2000
Examines the case of Dana Ewell and the murder of Tara Carter in Paterson, New Jersey.
51	10	"Blood Money"	February 8, 2000
Charlene Kauer is murdered during a robbery at her Oklahoma City home. Investigators in Tyler, Texas suspects that Betty Lucas fatal fall was not an accident. The murder of Denise Stawkowski in Lincoln, Nebraska exposes family secrets.
52	11	"Murder by Numbers"	February 15, 2000
A look at the crime sprees of Cleophus Prince Jr., Anthony Sully and William Suff.
53	12	"Federal Offense"	March 28, 2000
Murder cases where the Bureau of Alcohol, Tobacco, and Firearms is called in to assist, are examined. Cases like John Leonard Orr.
54	13	"Flames of Justice"	April 4, 2000
A fatal house fire killed Wendy Vargo in Plymouth, Connecticut. Police believe that Debora Green is responsible for a deadly fire. A blaze kills two firefighters in a New Smyrna Beach, Florida restaurant.

=== Season 6 (2000–01) ===
No. overall	No. in season	Title	Original release date
55	1	"False Witness"	October 10, 2000
Staged crime scenes were used in the murder of Tammy Lohr, the shooting of Carol Bruce, and the death of Victoria Beckham.
56	2	"Trails of Evidence"	October 24, 2000
The body of a 12 year old girl is found in the rugged mountains of Fountain, Colorado. Detectives in Galveston, Texas must decipher a message written in blood. To prove foul play, police in Madison, Wisconsin have to rely on a flimsy square of plastic.
57	3	"Missing"	November 21, 2000
Approximately 1.8 million Americans are reported missing each year. When foul play is suspected, investigators turn to forensics to find the missing.
58	4	"In the Line of Fire"	November 7, 2000
A serial sniper is on the loose in Long Island. His pattern leaves investigators with one clue. In Waycross, Georgia a young couple are shot to death during a fishing trip. Spent bullets are the only evidence left behind.
59	5	"For Love or Money"	December 12, 2000
Examining three cases involving relationships that turned fatal. The murder of Sherri Dally, the murder of Victor Gunnarsson and the killing of Nanette Hansen.
60	6	"Left at the Scene"	December 26, 2000
The crimes committed by Daniel Conahan, James Randall and the Murder of Debra Massie in Hagerstown, Maryland.
61	7	"Invisible Death"	February 1, 2001
Poisoning cases are examined. The first case involved the murder of Robert Curley. The second involved a case of a Roselle, New Jersey police officer.
62	8	"To Kill Again"	February 13, 2001
Serial killers Faryion Wardrip and Dorothea Puente are examined.
63	9	"Written in Bone"	March 6, 2001
Solving the murders of Joyce Klindt in Davenport, Iowa; Sandra Jean Stuller in Elyria, Ohio and Erlinda Anderson in Lockport, Illinois with the help of Clyde Snow and Owen Lovejoy.
64	10	"Cold Blooded"	April 17, 2001
The rape and murder of Janet Baxter, the ransom kidnapping and murder of Michael Kinney, and the murder of James Bradley Wren are examined.
65	11	"Fatal Error"	May 1, 2001
Examines the crimes of James Koedatich and a murder disguised as a car accident in Logan, Utah.
66	12	"Dead in the Water"	May 22, 2001
Investigators must turn to forensic science to solve homicides in which the victims were found in bodies of water.
67	13	"Scent of the Kill"	September 11, 2001
In this episode, police use specially trained dogs to solve the murders of Francis Fitz, Karen Warner and Kathy Beadle.

=== Season 7 (2001–02) ===
No. overall	No. in season	Title	Original release date
68	1	"Blood Lust"	September 18, 2001
Includes the murder sprees of serial killers Michael Lee Lockhart and Dana Sue Gray.
69	2	"Deadly Aim"	August 28, 2001
Includes the murder spree of Cesar Barone and the murders of John and Lori Rainwater.
70	3	"Stolen Identity"	September 4, 2001
Includes the 1994 murder of Stella Sproule and 1994 murder of retired schoolteacher Paul Gruber.
71	4	"Silent Witness"	September 11, 2001
Examines the disappearance and murder of Sandra Hernandez, the murder and identification of Sandra Gail Leslie, and the murder investigation of Irene Kovak.
72	5	"Deadly Intentions"	September 25, 2001
Police only clues are spent bullet casings when Harry Kyzer is found dead in his Newport News, Virginia home. When Kerry Jason Kujawa is found outside San Marcos, Texas, internet experts had to track a killer through cyberspace. After Doris Carasi and Sonia Salinas are murdered in Universal City, California, detectives had to rely on blood patterns.
73	6	"Patterns of Guilt"	December 11, 2001
A suspect's shoe print matches one left at the crime scene of a double murder in Annapolis, Maryland. A bruise on a victim's body found near Klamath Falls, Oregon resembles the tread of a tire.
74	7	"A Deadly Smile"	December 18, 2001
Examining how some killers leave personal marks on their victims. With the help of forensic dentistry police capture the perpetrators, like Terry Driver.
75	8	"Military Justice"	January 1, 2002
When a murder occurs within the US Navy and United States Marine Corps, the Naval Criminal Investigative Service takes on the investigation.
76	9	"The Unforgotten"	February 19, 2002
Diligence and technology help catch perpetrators who believe their crimes have been forgotten.
77	10	"Buried Secrets"	February 26, 2002
Forensic anthropologists use art and science to give faces to victims long after their bodies have been reduced to bones. The Murder of Al Adamson.
78	11	"Tainted Blood"	March 5, 2002
A woman is hit by a train in Crestview, Florida. What looks like a suicide could be a killer attempting to cover his tracks. A wife goes missing from her Phoenix, Arizona home. Police must rely on a drop of blood to determine her fate.
79	12	"Proof of Innocence"	March 19, 2002
When an innocent person is convicted of murder, discriminating DNA testing can provide proof of their innocence when appearance suggests otherwise. Looking into the murder of Dawn Hamilton and the crimes of Gerald Parker with the wrongful convictions of Kirk Bloodsworth and Kevin Green.
80	13	"Drawing Conclusions"	March 26, 2002
Identifying an unknown victim is not easy, but using the latest techniques, forensic artists can draw conclusions from the remains.
81	14	"Stranger than Fiction"	September 10, 2002
When homicide investigators meet crime writers, it transpires that real-life stories are often stranger than fiction. George Russell
82	15	"Predators and Parasites"	May 21, 2002
Forensic entomologists can learn when a murder was committed by studying the insects that nest inside a dead body. William M. Bass
83	16	"In the Camera's Eye"	June 11, 2002
A store clerk is killed during a robbery in Chattanooga, Tennessee. Two elderly people are found murdered in Albany, New York.
84	17	"Wasted Youth"	June 25, 2002
Murders committed by juveniles. Examines the murders of Micah Pollock, the Wilson family, and Brad Hansen.
85	18	"Collective Justice"	September 24, 2002
Cases solved with help from the Vidocq Society are examined. Featured cases: The 1984 murder of Terri Brooks and the 1991 disappearance of Scott Dunn.

=== Season 8 (2002–03) ===
No. overall	No. in season	Title	Original release date
86	1	"Murder for Hire"	October 15, 2002
For some killers, murder can be a lucrative business. When a victim has been targeted for death, investigators must dig deep and go beyond the obvious to uncover a murder for hire. Examines the murders of Wendy Kratzert and Sheila Bellush.
87	2	"Toxic Death"	December 3, 2002
When killers subdue their victims with sedatives and disguise the crime scene, identifying the true cause of death can be difficult.
87	3	"Material Witness"	December 10, 2002
Police must rely on a single strand of animal hair to solve the Murder of Shirley Duguay. When Noreen Boyle disappears, her husband John F. Boyle Jr. falls under suspicion. In Bethany, Missouri, Alfred Pinegar is brutally killed.
89	4	"Betrayed"	December 17, 2002
Sometimes, when a death seems to be accidental, it is up to forensic scientists to reveal the deception lying just below the surface. Robin Lee Row
90	5	"Elements of Murder"	December 24, 2002
A well-executed homicide can baffle even the most skilled investigators. Examines the murders of Susan Galloway from Great Falls, Montana; Lenora Robinson in Nashville, Tennessee; and Jennifer McCready from Belpre, Ohio.
91	6	"Random Targets"	January 14, 2003
The most terrifying cases occur when the killer appears to choose victims seemingly without any reason. Examining the murder sprees of Mark William Cunningham and Timothy Wilson Spencer.
92	7	"Grave Secrets"	February 11, 2003
Sometimes, victims may lay hidden for years before they are discovered. That's when forensic scientists are called upon to reveal buried clues. In Salinas, California, a couple finds a body a shallow grave under their new house. It belongs to Chris Denoyer, a teenager who disappeared 14 years previously. In East Lansing, Michigan the search for missing Mark Bosom goes cold. When his remains are found two years later, it uncovers a cold blooded murder.
93	8	"At Close Range"	February 18, 2003
When killers bent on revenge on revenge, forensics examiners look for hidden clues to bring justice for those who were murdered. Examines the murder of Kathleen Martin in Pelham, New York; and of Leo and Mary Donnard in Ammon, Idaho.
94	9	"Lethal Encounter"	March 25, 2003
A sadistic serial killer is preying on women in Tampa, Florida. He's using cemeteries as his dumping ground and the body count is rising. In Raleigh, North Carolina, a woman is found murdered in her car. Examines convicted murderers Michael Tyrone Crump and Michael Sexton.
95	10	"Crimes of Passion"	April 22, 2003
Police rely on forensic science to reveal murder victims' pasts and expose those guilty of committing crimes of passion. Like in the case of Marlin Barnes from Miami Beach, Florida or Ralph Gawor from Fresno, California.
96	11	"Absent Witness"	May 13, 2003
After his house burned down in Augusta, Georgia detectives can’t locate William Hamilton. Near Clarksville, Tennessee police find the abandoned car of Marilyn June Adkins.
97	12	"Marked for Death"	July 17, 2003
With no fingerprints at the scene, detectives turn to cutting-edge forensic techniques to track a callous killer, hoping to catch him before he could strike again. Examines the murder sprees of Richard William Kutzner in Spring, Texas and Calvin Stallworth in Foley, Alabama.
98	13	"Fatal Abductions"	June 10, 2003
Kidnappers always leaves clues behind, but chasing them takes time. Examines the murder of Natalie Mirabal in Longmont, Colorado, and the murder of Katie Poirier.
99	14	"Medical Examiner's Casebook"	July 19, 2003
Some killers choose to hide their victim. Investigators must then rely on forensic examiners to uncover proof of murder. Examining the murder of Cordell Richards and nine-year-old Jackie Beard.
100	15	"Trial by Fire"	August 19, 2003
When a fire destroys every clue, it's a challenge for forensics investigator. The murder of Donald Harmacek from La Crosse, Wisconsin; and a series of arson-murders committed by Edwin Kaprat in Spring Hill, Florida.
101	16	"Undaunted"	July 8, 2003
Solving crimes may begin with intuition but advanced science provides investigators with irrefutable proof to uncover the truth. Examines the sexual assault of Patricia White from Long Beach, California and the murder of two-year-old Mikey Carter in Coquille, Oregon.
102	17	"Forsaken Trust"	August 5, 2003
When victims of murder know their killers, they are often caught off guard. But even the best-laid plans leave traces of the forsaken trust. Examining the familicide committed by Robert Meyer in Sitka, Alaska and the murder of Candace Brown in Birmingham, Alabama.
103	18	"Coroner Investigator"	January 3, 2004
An in-depth look at the science of death and the firsthand techniques and methodology used by Los Angeles County coroner Julie Wilson.

=== Season 9 (2003–04) ===
No. overall	No. in season	Title	Original release date
104	1	"Hidden Obsessions"	October 28, 2003
Some killers go to great length to leave little trace of their violence. Murder convictions of James Lawson in Hamilton, Ohio and Calvin Parker in San Diego.
105	2	"Blind Trust"	November 25, 2003
Often, a killer will build the victim's trust before he or she attacks. Examines the 1998 murder of Carly Martinez in Las Cruces, New Mexico and the case of serial killer Sean Patrick Goble.
106	3	"Shattered Vows"	January 10, 2004
A car crashes down an embankment near El Dorado Hills, California. Rescue workers scramble to save a couple trapped inside. Susan Moyer lay motionless while passenger Mitch McLees is barely conscious. Kristine Fitzhugh is found dead at the bottom of her basement stairs in Palo Alto, California. Both cases an unexpected twist is revealed during a routine investigation.
107	4	"Fatal Impressions"	January 13, 2004
Whether a crime is meticulously planned, perpetrators leaves behind clues. Includes the killing spree of Christian Fuhr and the murder of Bonnie Horinek in Fort Worth, Texas.
108	5	"Misplaced Loyalty"	January 17, 2004
When investigators in Berkeley, California start sifting through the ashes of a house fire, they have no idea it will lead a trail of deception. The episode focus on the murder conviction of Christine Loyd.
109	6	"Silent Killers"	March 13, 2004
Perpetrators try to disguise their crimes to avoid prosecution. Murder convictions of Helen Moore and serial poison killer Sukhwinder Dhillon.
110	7	"Out to Kill"	March 16, 2004
When criminals are repeat offenders authorities are more dedicated to solve this crimes. Murders of Aimee Willard and Christopher Meyer.
111	8	"Raw Greed"	March 27, 2004
Criminals who killed for money are brought to justice with evidence found on mundane household objects. Edmund Emerick (guilty of killing 2 bar workers in Dayton, Ohio) and Sharon Zachary (guilty of killing her elderly neighbor in Battle Creek, Michigan).
112	9	"Murderous Attraction"	April 10, 2004
A school teacher is hospitalized due to arsenic poisoning; a Columbus, Ohio woman is fatally shot in her bedroom and her death is staged to look like a suicide.
113	10	"Broken Trust"	April 24, 2004
Cases include: Reyna Marroquín, whose remains were found in a barrel thirty years after her disappearance; Orville Lynn Majors, a nurse who was convicted of murdering his patients.
114	11	"Killing Time"	January 29, 2004
A killer will often try to disguise the victim's body in an attempt to the hide the actual cause of death. However, forensics cannot be fooled. Solving the murders of Tammy Karen in Wurtsboro, New York and Jane DesMarais in Rutland, Vermont.
115	12	"Price of Murder"	May 8, 2004
When the amount of money is substantial enough, a person can be motivated to do terrible things. Police discover that a large life insurance policy was motive for Larry Holman's murder near Hillsboro, Missouri. A woman hires outside help to cover up her husband Jack Jones death with claims of a brutal home invasion in Green Cove Springs, Florida.
116	13	"Stolen Youth"	June 12, 2004
Features two disappearance/murder cases: Nine-year-old Valiree Jackson in Spokane, Washington; Ten-year-old Cassidy Senter in St. Louis.
117	14	"Loved To Death"	July 17, 2004
Elena Tchoudakova is found beaten to death in her Toronto apartment; the case of convicted murderer John David Smith.
118	15	"Written in Blood"	August 14, 2004
The murder of Kathleen Peterson in Durham, North Carolina by husband Michael Peterson is examined. Also explored is the murder of Susan Avitt by her husband Charles in Lodi, California.
119	16	"Critical Evidence"	August 28, 2004
The decomposed body of Yvette Budram is found near a country road in Hamilton, Ontario; World War II veteran Walter Yokum is shot to death in his Broomfield, Colorado home.
120	17	"Fatal Twist"	September 18, 2004
In 1998, 8 month pregnant Melissa O'Connell is found murdered in her Chesapeake, Virginia home. In 1990, the murder of Carolyn Rogers shocks Roanoke, Virginia.
121	18	"Vanished"	October 31, 2004
Forensic examination is used in cases where the victim or the killer abruptly vanishes after a crime. John Edward Robinson, Arohn Kee

*A pseudonym for the victim was given in the episode +A pseudonym for the killer was given in the episode
