= Killing of Joseph Augustus Zarelli =

1957 American murder victim (identified 2022)

Joseph Augustus Zarelli
- Born: January 13, 1953
- Status: Identified on December 8, 2022 (65 years, 9 months, and 13 days after discovery)
- Died: February 1957 (aged 4)
- Cause of death: Homicide by blunt force trauma
- Body discovered: February 25, 1957; 69 years ago Fox Chase, Philadelphia, Pennsylvania, U.S.
- Resting place: Ivy Hill Cemetery, Cedarbrook, Philadelphia, U.S
- Monuments: Grave memorial engraved with "America's Unknown Child"; Sign memorial where the victim's body was found
- Other names: America's Unknown Child; Philadelphia Box Boy; Boy in the Box; Boy in a Box
- Height: 3 ft 6 in (1.07 m)
- Parents: Augustus John Zarelli (father); Mary Elizabeth Plunkett (mother)

Joseph Augustus Zarelli (January 13, 1953 – February 1957), known until 2022 as the "Boy in the Box", the "Boy in a Box" or "America's Unknown Child", was an American four-year-old male whose nude, malnourished and beaten body was found on the side of Susquehanna Road, in Philadelphia, Pennsylvania, on February 25, 1957. Zarelli appeared to have been cleaned and freshly groomed, with a recent haircut and trimmed fingernails, although he had suffered extensive physical attacks prior to his death, with multiple bruises on his body. He was also severely malnourished. His body was covered with scars, some of which were surgical (most notably on his ankle, groin and chin). Authorities believe that the cause of death was homicide by blunt force trauma.

Despite the publicity and sporadic interest throughout the years, the boy's identity remained unknown for over half a century. On November 30, 2022, the Philadelphia Police Department announced that detectives had determined the boy's identity using DNA and genealogical databases. On December 8, 2022, more than sixty-five years after his body was found, Zarelli was publicly identified. Despite the identification, the exact circumstances leading to his death are uncertain and the case is still considered an open homicide investigation.

== Discovery of the body ==
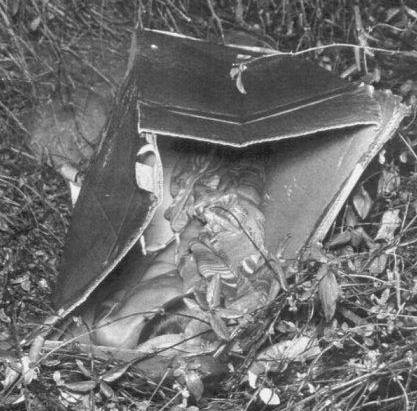
The crime scene where Zarelli was found

On February 25, 1957, the body of Joseph Augustus Zarelli, wrapped in a plaid blanket, was found in the woods off Susquehanna Road in the Fox Chase neighborhood of Philadelphia. The body was discovered by a young man who was checking his rabbit traps. Fearing that police would confiscate his traps, he did not report what he had found. A few days later, a college student spotted a rabbit running into the underbrush. Knowing that there were traps in the area, he stopped his car to investigate and discovered the body. He was also reluctant to have any contact with police, but he did report what he had found the following day, after hearing of the disappearance of Mary Jane Barker in Bellmawr, New Jersey.

Zarelli's naked body had been placed inside a cardboard box that had once contained a bassinet of the kind sold by J. C. Penney. His hair had been recently cropped, possibly after death, as clumps of hair clung to the body. There were signs of severe malnourishment, as well as surgical scars on the ankle and groin, and an L-shaped scar under the chin.

== Investigation prior to identification ==
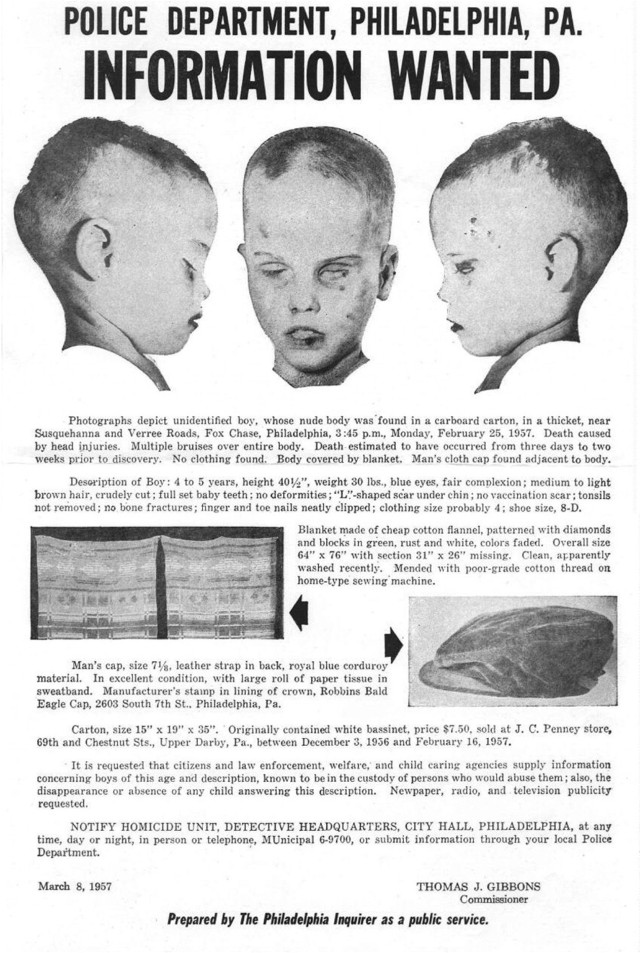
Posters showing Zarelli's postmortem photos that were distributed during the initial investigation

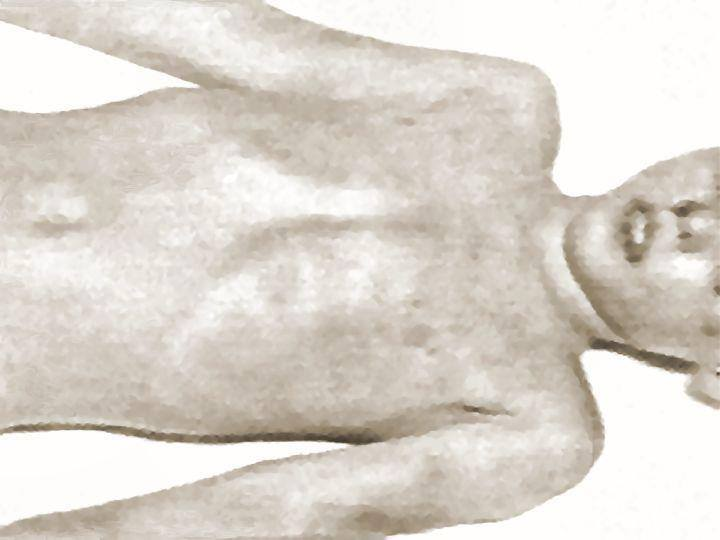
Zarelli's torso, showing signs of severe malnutrition, starvation and scarring

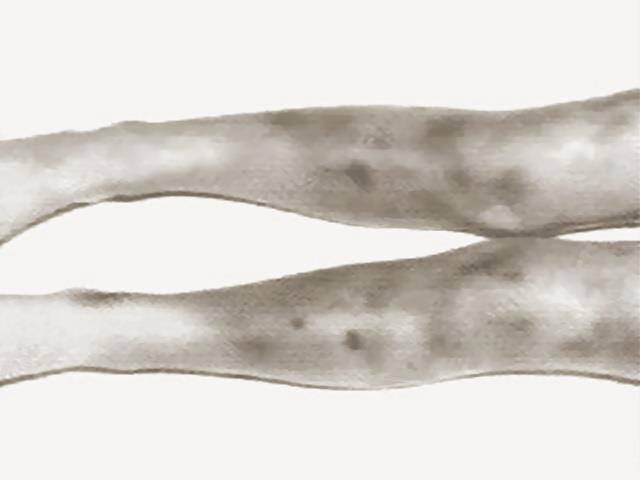
Zarelli's legs showing signs of severe bruising, malnutrition and scarring

The Philadelphia Police Department (PPD) opened an investigation on February 26, 1957. The dead boy's fingerprints were taken, and police at first were optimistic that he would soon be identified. However, no one ever came forward with any useful information.

The case attracted considerable media attention in Philadelphia and the surrounding metropolitan area. The Philadelphia Inquirer printed 400,000 flyers depicting the boy's likeness, which were sent out and posted across the area, and were included with every gas bill in Philadelphia. The crime scene was combed repeatedly by 270 police academy recruits, who discovered a man's blue corduroy cap, a child's scarf and a man's white handkerchief with the letter "G" in the corner, all clues that led nowhere. Police also distributed a post-mortem photograph of the boy fully dressed and in a seated position, as he may have looked in life, in the hope it might lead to a clue.

In 1998, the boy's body was exhumed for the purpose of extracting DNA, which was obtained from a tooth. On March 21, 2016, the National Center for Missing & Exploited Children released a forensic facial reconstruction of the victim and added him into their database. The body was exhumed again in 2019 to retrieve additional DNA samples.

== Identification ==
The child was an unidentified murder victim for decades. However, on November 30, 2022, the PPD announced that they had identified the child through the use of genetic testing and investigative genetic genealogy, and that they would provide a case update in the following week. Sources stated that he was the child of a prominent family in Delaware County. Authorities said that an investigation would use the new information to continue the search for suspects.

On December 8, 2022, the child was publicly identified as four-year-old Joseph Augustus Zarelli, born on January 13, 1953. Genealogists had uncovered his name more than a year earlier, in October 2021. On January 19, 2023, the names of Zarelli's parents were reported.

Investigators were finally able to identify Zarelli after a cousin uploaded DNA to a public database. Investigators subsequently encouraged that person's mother (a first cousin of Zarelli) to submit a genetic profile to GEDmatch, which she did, allowing investigators to identify his parents. A court order for the child's birth certificate was then made, which revealed the child's name and his parents' names, which were also subsequently verified by DNA.

== Theories prior to identification ==
Before his identification in 2022, several prominent theories regarding the boy's origin were investigated by law enforcement and amateur sleuths.

=== The foster home ===
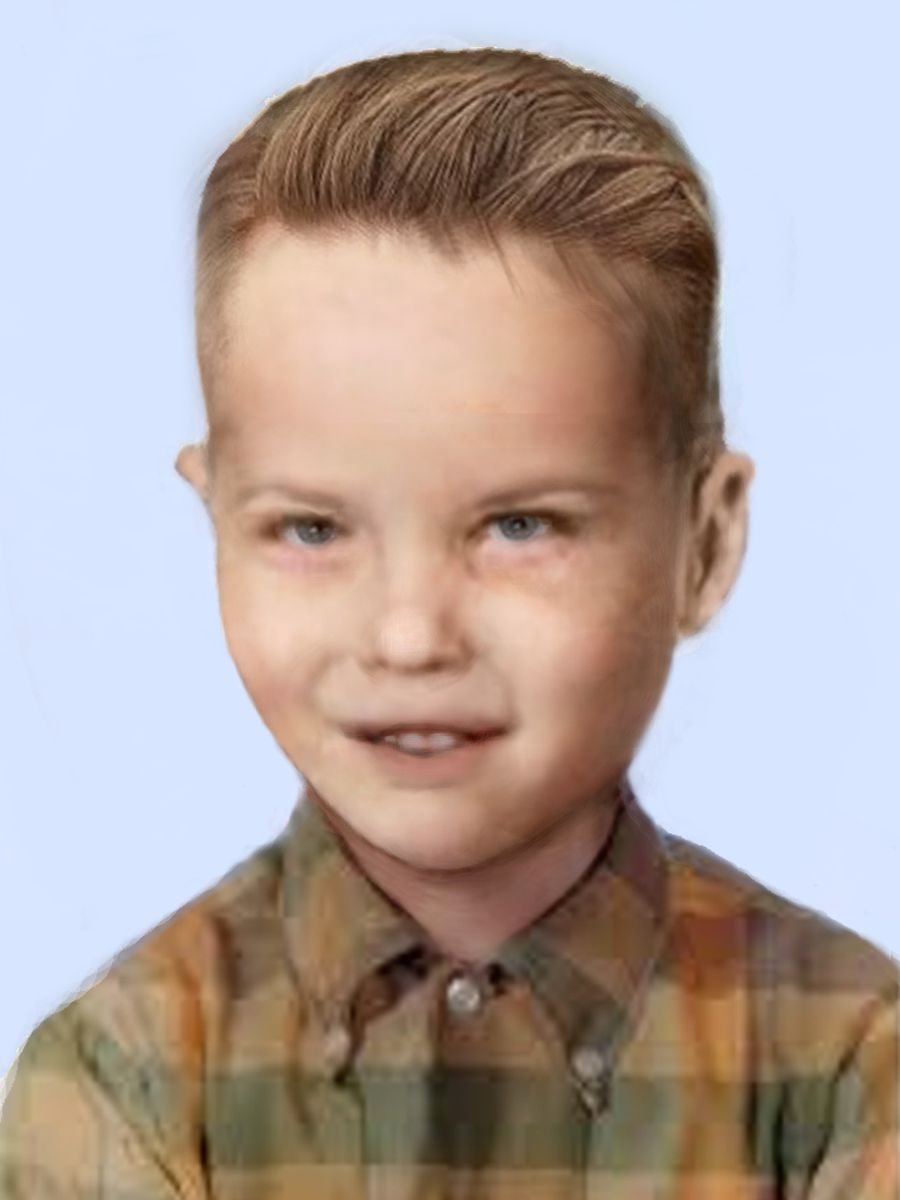
Forensic facial reconstruction by Carl Koppelman showing what Zarelli may have looked like when he was alive

In 1960, Remington Bristow, an employee of the medical examiner's office who doggedly pursued the case until his death in 1993, contacted a New Jersey psychic, who told him to look for a house that matched a foster home that was located approximately 1.5 miles (2.5 km) from the site of the body. When the psychic was brought to the Philadelphia discovery site, she led Bristow directly to the foster home.

Upon attending an estate sale at the foster home, Bristow discovered a bassinet similar to the one sold at J. C. Penney. He also discovered blankets hanging on the clothesline that were similar to the one in which the boy's body had been wrapped when discovered. Bristow believed that the boy was the son of the stepdaughter of the man who ran the foster home, and that they disposed of his body so the stepdaughter would not be exposed as an unwed mother.

However, police established that all the foster children at the home were accounted for, and a reexamination by investigators confirmed that the family were likely not involved. In 1998, PPD lieutenant Tom Augustine, who was in charge of the investigation, and several members of the Vidocq Society (a group of retired policemen and profilers), interviewed the foster father and the stepdaughter (whom he had married). The foster home investigation was closed.

=== The woman known as Martha or "M" ===
Another theory was brought forward in February 2002 by a woman identified only as Martha, or "M", accusing her mother of acquiring and killing the child. Police considered her story plausible but were troubled by her testimony, as she had a history of mental illness. Martha claimed that her parents purchased a boy named Jonathan from his birth parents in the summer of 1954, after which he was beaten to death and his body left abandoned inside a box outside of town. Police were unable to verify her story. Neighbors who had access to Martha's house during the stated time period denied that there had been a young boy living there and dismissed her claims as "ridiculous".

=== Other theories ===
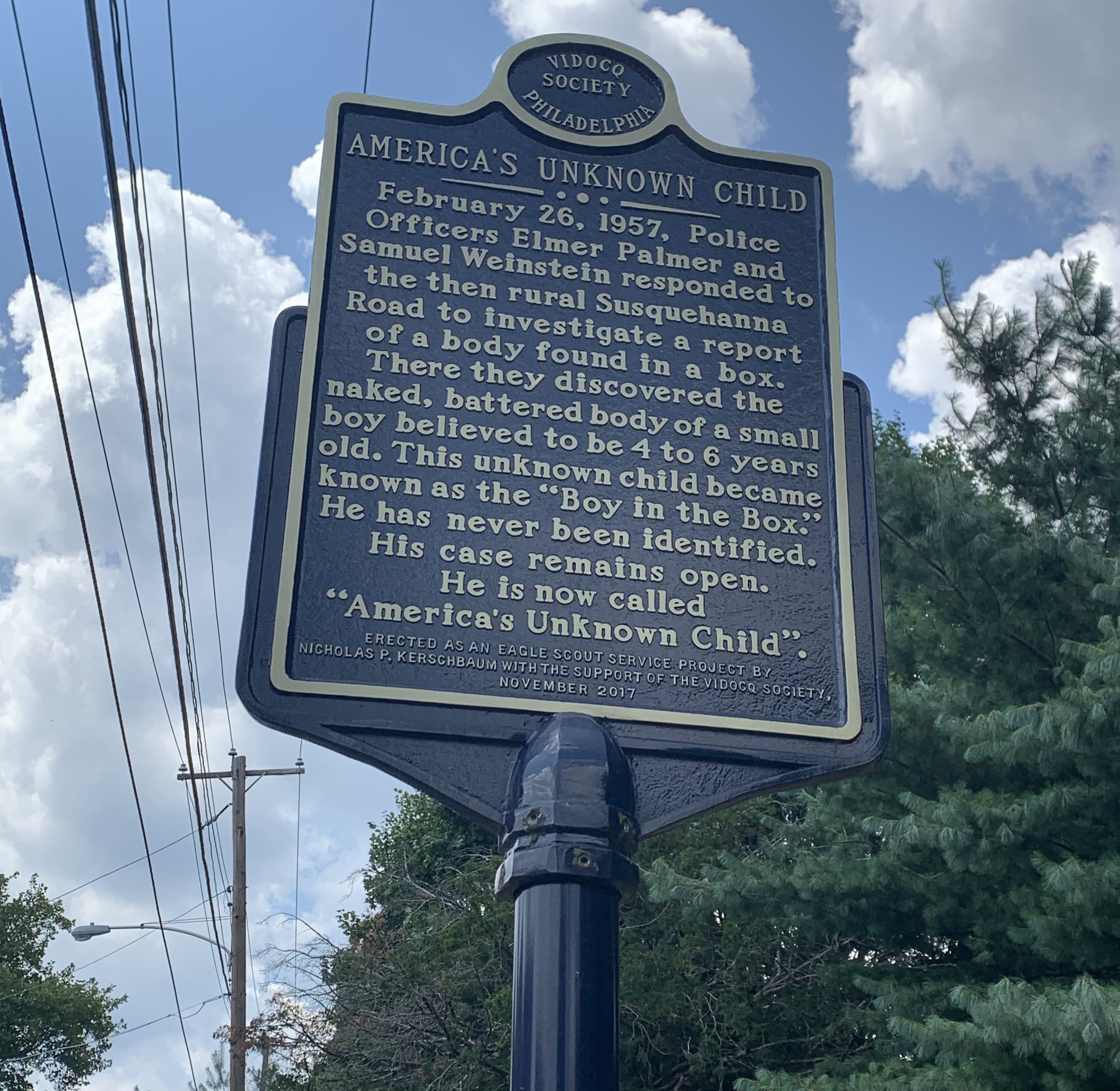
Memorial sign near the location where the body was found on the side of Susquehanna Road. The sign was erected five years before Zarelli's identification.

Forensic artist Frank Bender developed a theory that the victim may have been raised as a girl. Zarelli's unprofessional haircut, which appeared to have been performed in haste, was the basis for the scenario, as well as the appearance of the eyebrows having been styled. In 2008, Bender released a sketch of the unidentified child with long hair, reflecting the strands found on the body.

In 2016, two writers, Jim Hoffmann and Louis Romano, believed they had discovered a potential relative from Memphis, Tennessee, and requested that their DNA be compared with the boy. The lead was originally discovered by a Philadelphia man (who introduced Romano and Hoffmann to each other) and was developed and presented, with the help of Hoffmann, to the PPD and the Vidocq Society in early 2013. In December 2013, Romano became aware of the lead and agreed to help obtain the DNA from this particular relative in January 2014, which was sent quickly to the PPD. Local authorities confirmed that they would investigate the lead, but said they would need to do more research on the circumstances surrounding the link to Memphis before comparing DNA. In December 2017 Homicide Sgt. Bob Kuhlmeier confirmed that DNA taken from the Memphis man was compared to the boy, and there was no connection.

== Burial ==
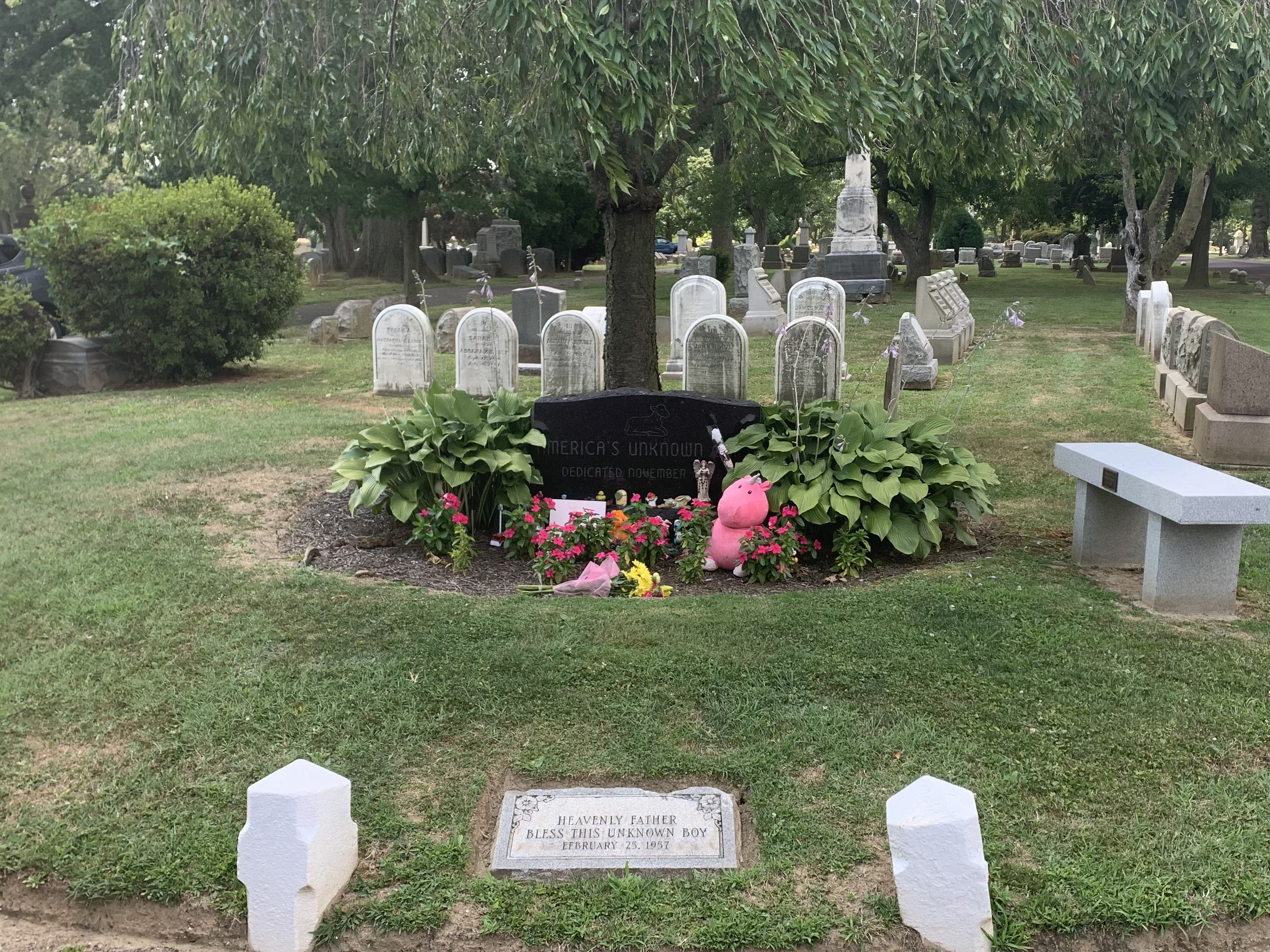
Zarelli's grave at Ivy Hill Cemetery in August 2022

Zarelli was originally buried in a potter's field. In 1998, he was reburied at Ivy Hill Cemetery in the Cedarbrook section of Philadelphia, which donated a large plot. The coffin, headstone and funeral service were donated by the son of the man who buried Zarelli in 1957. There was significant public attendance and media coverage at the reburial. City residents keep the grave decorated with flowers and toys.

The large headstone when first installed contained the words "America's Unknown Child", with a plaque underneath reading, "Heavenly Father, Bless This Unknown Boy". On January 13, 2023, which would have been Zarelli's 70th birthday, a new memorial containing his full name and image was unveiled, along with the addition of his name to the existing headstone.

== Homicide investigation ==
At a December 2022 press conference, Philadelphia Police Commissioner Danielle Outlaw stated that Zarelli's death is "still an active homicide investigation and we still need the public's help." Law enforcement reported at the same conference that both of Zarelli's biological parents are deceased, but the child has living half-siblings.

At the same December 2022 press conference, Philadelphia law enforcement stated that Zarelli had lived in the area of 61st and Market streets. "I don't know what the neighbors knew or didn't know," said the head of the PPD police homicide unit, Captain Jason Smith, at the conference. "The child did live past the age of four years old, so there would have been somebody out there that would have seen this child, perhaps another family member that hasn't stepped forward, possibly a neighbor that remembers seeing that child, and remembers whatever was occurring at that particular household."

In January 2023, Philadelphia station WCAU reported that Zarelli "was born to a couple that lived at 64th and Callowhill" although, the station stated, it was "unclear if he lived there long enough for people to even notice him." That same month, the Inquirer reported that Zarelli's biological parents were Augustus John Zarelli and Mary Elizabeth (née Abel) Plunkett; the couple, who were not married or were ever known to be in a relationship, both married other partners sometime after Zarelli was born. Abel had previously put a baby girl up for adoption, and her cousin speculated, in a 2023 interview, that Abel might not have been the one who raised Zarelli, possibly giving him over to adoption.

== See also ==
- List of murdered American children
- List of solved missing person cases: 1950–1999
- List of unsolved murders (1900–1979)

== Bibliography ==
- Evans, Colin (1996). The Casebook of Forensic Detection: How Science Solved 100 of the World's Most Baffling Crimes. New York: John Wiley & Sons Inc. ISBN 0-471-07650-3.
- Hoffmann, Jim (2012). The Boy in the Box: America's Unknown Child (Revised ed.). Bloomington, IL: Rooftop Publishing. ISBN 978-1-600-08034-0.
- Newton, Michael (2004). The Encyclopedia of Unsolved Crimes. New York: Facts on File. ISBN 978-0-816-07818-9.
- Stout, David (2008). Boy in the Box: The Unsolved Case of America's Unknown Child. United States: Lyons Press. ISBN 978-1-599-21269-2.
- Thompson, Emily G. (2017). Unsolved Child Murders: Eighteen American Cases, 1956–1998. North Carolina: McFarland & Company Inc. ISBN 978-1-476-67000-3.
