= Infamous Murders =

- Countries of origin: United States; United Kingdom
- No. of episodes: 51

Original release
- Network: The History Channel
- Release: 2001 – 2004

Infamous Murders is a documentary television series shown on The History Channel in the U.S. and the UK. The U.S. edition was narrated by Don Peoples. In the UK edition, the narrator is uncredited.

== Overview ==
The 51 episodes of the series were produced by Nugus/Martin Productions Ltd. in 2001. The show was aired on The History Channel in both the UK and the U.S. In the U.S., the show was included as part of the 154-episode run of History's Mysteries. During the hour-long show, two episodes of Infamous Murders were presented together.

Each episode was thirty minutes long. Three crimes that share a common theme, such as motive, means, or victims, are given ten minutes of time apiece. The series concentrated on notorious murders carried out during the 20th century. At the beginning of each episode, a particularly infamous crime would be examined as an example. The words "Infamous Murders now examines..." would follow, and the other three murders would be presented.

The series relied on historical documents for visuals rather than reenactments. Dramatic music was used to heighten the narration along with rostrum shots of photographs and vintage television/film footage.

Reruns of the show could be seen on The History Channel, the Crime & Investigation Network, Biography Channel, and History International. After History International became H2 in 2011, the rights to the series were discontinued.

A 17-disc DVD version of the series was released in the UK as Ultimate Crimes: The World’s Most Infamous Murders by Odeon Entertainment in 2002. Each disc contains three episodes.

== Series Credits ==
Narrator (U.S.): Don Peoples

Music: De Wolfe Music

Music Advisor: Alan Howe

Production Facilities: Barnes Trust Television

On-line Editor: Joe Turner

editor: Crispin Julian

Rostrum: Frameline

Research Director: George Marshall

Script Writer: Nicolas Wright

Line Producer: Ron Glenister

Producer/Director: Jonathan Martin

Executive Producer: Philip Nugus

Produced by Nugus/Martin Productions Ltd.

== Episode list ==
Angels of Death (2001) Nurses sometimes kill: Donald Harvey, Orville Lynn Majors, Beverly Allitt

Bizarre Murders (2001) Young Ronald DeFeo shoots his family; mountain-gorilla researcher Dian Fossey is hacked to death; Italian banker is found hanging from a bridge.

The Cannibals (2001) Several killers, both real and fictional, consume their victims: Jeffrey Dahmer, Andrei Chikatilo, Ed Gein

Celebrity Murder (2001) Sometimes famous people also get killed: Sharon Tate; Gianni Versace; Joe Orton.

Crimes of Prejudice (2001) Deaths of civil-rights workers; political and ethnic killings; murders of gay men.

Cult Killings (2001) Cult leaders exert huge power over members, sometimes causing them to kill or to commit suicide: Jonestown massacre, The Order of the Solar Temple, Aleph (formerly Aum Shinrikyo).

Deadly Doctors (2001) A doctor convicted of killing her daughter-in-law may be innocent; a doctor gets away with the murders of 132 patients; a British doctor may have killed as many as 1,000 female patients.

Deadly Kidnappings (2001) Although kidnapping is relatively rare, it can easily turn to murder: Charley Ross, Lindbergh kidnapping, murder of Muriel McKay, kidnapping and murder of Lesley Whittle

Deadly Ladies (2001) Women sometimes kill: Madame Fahmy, Ma Barker, Velma Barfield, Karla Faye Tucker.

Death in the Country (2001) Even America's heartland is not immune to violent crime: Billy Cook, Gaston Dominici, Ángel Maturino Reséndiz.

Evading Justice (2001) Several serial killers evade punishment: Green River Killer, Zodiac Killer, New York Zodiac Killer and Jack the Stripper.

Evidence of Murder (2001) Crucial evidence sometimes brings killers to justice years later: Browne and Kennedy, James Hanratty, John List, Brian Donald Hume.

Final Justice (2001) Criminals who received the capital punishment: Robert Alton Harris, Gary Gilmore, Steven Judy.

From Coast to Coast (2001) Traveling murderers roam the country or the world in search of victims: John Eric Armstrong, Ted Bundy, Christopher Wilder.

Gangland Murders (2001) Prohibition-era gangsters Al Capone and Lucky Luciano fight for supremacy; bank robber John Dillinger becomes public enemy number one.

Hollywood Murders (2001) A suicide note accompanies the death of a movie producer; in 1935, a screen idol becomes an apparent suicide; in 1958, a teenage daughter is charged with the murder of an actress's boyfriend.

Horror on the Highways (2001) The anonymity of the highway and the speed of its traffic make it an ideal dumping ground for murderers. Henry Lee Lucas, William Bonin, Joseph Paul Franklin

Inheritance Killers (2001) Money can be the motive for murder: Steven Benson, Jeremy Bamber, Lyle and Erik Menendez.

Intent on Murder (2001) Some killers choose their victims by type: Belle Gunness, John Wayne Gacy, Gary Heidnik, Kenneth Erskine.

Killing for Pleasure (2001) Neville Heath, the Hillside Strangler, and the Coed Killer.

Killing for Thrills (2001) Some killers transform their homes into chambers of horror: Leonard Lake and Charles Ng, Fred and Rose West, Thomas Neill Cream

Lady Killers (2001) Serial killers John Christie, Richard Speck, and William Heirens.

Mass Murderers (2001) Rampage killings: Fritz Haarmann, Hungerford massacre, Charles Whitman, Dean Corll

Model Murders (2001) Many young women's dreams of an easy and glamorous modeling career are cut short. Judy Ann Dull, Vicki Morgan, Linda Sobek.

Murder at the Top (2001) Louis Mountbatten, 1st Earl Mountbatten of Burma; Ernst Röhm; Bishop Juan Conendra Geradi.

Murder by Decree (2001) Murder is sometimes used to silence people who threaten the system: Martin Luther King, Georgi Markov, Joseph Yablonski.

Murder for Hire (2001) Hit-men are paid to kill: Judge Peel, Mother Duncan, Carlos the Jackal.

Murder for Profit (2001) Some kill to satisfy their greed: Dorothea Puente, Michael X, John George Haigh.

Murder in Cold Blood (2001) Some murderers kill for no apparent reason: Juan Corona, Dennis Nilsen, Wayne Williams.

Murder in High Office (2001) Anwar Sadat; Yitzhak Rabin, Hendrik Vewoerd.

Murdered on Duty (2001) When a colleague dies in the line of duty, police officers work tirelessly to catch the killer: Katherine Ann Power, Guenther Podola, Roberts, Whitney & Duddy.

Murdering Conmen (2001) Conmen worm their way into victims' lives and kill them for their cash: Donald Merrett, Roy Fontaine, Raymond Fernandez and Martha Beck.

New York Mafia Murders (2001) The struggle for mob leadership leads to an endless cycle of murder and blood feuds: Frank Costello, Joe Gallo and Larry Gallo.

Poisoned to Death (2001) Poisoners leave clear trails for police to follow.: Mary Ann Cotton, Herbert Armstrong, Graham Young, Judy Buenuano.

The Poisoners (2001) Doctors abuse their positions of trust to administer poison to their victims: Harvey Crippen, Carl Coppolino, Arthur Waite.

Political Assassinations (2001) Politics can be a deadly business: Mahatma Gandhi, Robert F. Kennedy, Aldo Moro

Political Killings (2001) Malcolm X; Sacco and Vanzetti; Harvey Milk and George Moscone.

Premeditated Murder (2001) Some killers plan their actions to the very last detail: Ruth Snyder, Mark David Chapman, Leopold and Loeb.

A Question of Doubt (2001) The disappearance of Teamsters leader Jimmy Hoffa; a man accused of the 1919 murder of a young Englishwoman is acquitted; a doctor stands trial for the 1954 murder of his wife.

Red Light Murders (2001) The life of a prostitute can be brutal and short: Murder of Robin Benedict, Robert Lee Yates, Richard Cottingham.

Royal Murders (2001) Saudi Arabia's King Faisal; Czar Nicholas II; the 2001 death of the king and queen of Nepal.

Savage Surgeons (2001) Surgeons use their expertise to hide their crimes: H. H. Holmes, Buck Ruxton, Jeffrey R. MacDonald, Marcel Petiot.

Society Murders (2001) Influential friends and expensive lawyers sometimes allow the wealthy to get away with murder: Jock Delves Broughton, William Woodward, Lord Lucan, Harry Oakes.

Somebody Killed the President! (2001) U.S. presidential assassinations: James Garfield, William McKinley, John F. Kennedy.

Spree Killings (2001) Bonnie and Clyde, Charles Starkweather and Caril Fugate, Paul John Knowles

Stalking the Innocent (2001) Some killers select their victims randomly: David Berkowitz, Gerald and Charlene Gallego, Peter Manuel.

Streets of Fear (2001) Axeman of New Orleans, Peter Sutcliffe, Joel Rifkin, Arthur Shawcross.

Terrorizing the Cities (2001) The Boston Strangler, Richard Ramirez and Patrick Kearney.

Trapped by Forensics (2001) Genetic fingerprinting: Frederick Seddon, John Duffy and David Mulcahy, Timothy Wilson Spencer, David Lashley.

The Trunk Murders (2001) Many murderers find that a large trunk is just the right size to hold a human corpse: Ira Einhorn, Tony Mancini, John Robinson.

Victims of Jealousy (2001) Jealousy and obsession can turn violent: Murder of William Terriss, Jean Harris, Murder of Dorothy Stratten, Ruth Ellis.

Women Who Kill (2001) Love triangle; female terrorist; female serial-killer.
