= Richard Walter (psychologist) =

American forensic psychologist

Richard Walter was an American forensic psychologist for the Michigan prison system until his retirement in 2000, and a self-styled "crime scene analyst" who has been characterized as one of the creators of modern criminal profiling.

A New York piece in April 2023 argued that Walter had inflated his credentials and work history and has been accused of perjuring himself as an expert witness in a murder trial.

== Career ==
Walter developed a number of psychological classifications for violent crime, and was a co-founder of the Vidocq Society, an organization of forensic professionals dedicated to solving cold cases. As a psychologist for Michigan's prison system, he reportedly had interviewed more than 22,000 convicted felons.

He and Robert D. Keppel, then the chief investigator for the Attorney General's Office in the State of Washington, wrote Profiling Killers: A Revised Classification Model for Understanding Sexual Murder. Keppel created the Homicide Information Tracking Unit (HITS) database, to which Walter was a prolific contributor. Walter was reportedly the first to develop a matrix as a tool of investigation using pre-crime, crime and post-crime behaviors to help develop suspects.

The Vidocq Society and its three co-founders, including Walter, were the subject of a 2010 book by Michael Capuzzo entitled The Murder Room: The Heirs of Sherlock Holmes Gather to Solve the World's Most Perplexing Cold Cases. Walter was also a Fellow of the American Academy of Forensic Sciences, a Fellow of the Royal Society of Medicine/Clinical Forensic Medicine, a Fellow of the Australasian College of Biomedical Sciences, and a 22-year prison psychologist for the state of Michigan. He has given lectures to police organizations and has been featured on television programs, such as America's Most Wanted.

== Notable cases ==
In 1989, Walter provided the psychological profile for mass murderer John List, who had evaded detection for 18 years. Using Walter's profile, forensic sculptor Frank Bender was able to create a bust of List that was accurately aged to reflect the changes in the unseen List's face over the years. This was featured on an episode of America's Most Wanted; the sculpture was so similar to List's current appearance that he was captured the next day.

In Lubbock, Texas in 1999, City Police solved the murder of Scott Dunn with Walter's aid. A rare case where a conviction was garnered in the absence of a body, it is chronicled in the book Trail of Blood by Wanda Evans and in the television series Medical Detectives.

In 2005, the Hudson, Wisconsin Police Department consulted with the Vidocq Society on the 2002 double homicide of Dan O'Connell and James Ellison. In October 2005, St. Croix County Judge Eric Lundell found probable cause that Fr. Ryan Erickson, a Roman Catholic priest who was trying to prevent O'Connell from going public with child molestation allegations, had committed the murders. Shortly before he could be arrested, Fr. Erickson hanged himself inside the offices of his own church in December 2004.

=== The Drake case ===
In October 1982, Walter testified in Niagara County (NY) Supreme Court in the double murder trial of Robie J. Drake, who was convicted of murdering fellow high school classmates Steven Rosenthal, 18, and Amy Smith, 16, in a "lover's lane" killing. Shortly before midnight on Dec. 5, 1981, Drake fired 19 rounds from a semiautomatic .22-caliber rifle into a 1969 Chevrolet Nova. He killed Smith with two shots in the back of the head, and shot Rosenthal fourteen times in the face and upper body. Then, with Rosenthal still groaning, Drake admitted he stabbed him in the back with a 71/2-inch hunting knife, according to The Buffalo News. He was accused of removing Smith from the car, biting her breasts, and trying to sexually assault her with a flashlight. Drake was caught by police at a landfill as he tried to stuff Smith's nude body into the trunk. According to New York, Walter testified that "Drake had committed a particular type of 'lust murder' because he was driven by 'piquerism,' an obscure sadistic impulse to derive sexual pleasure from penetrating people with bullets, knives, and teeth." Drake was sentenced to two consecutive terms of 20 years to life.

In 2003, after 27 years of appeals, Drake was granted a new trial when the U. S. Second Circuit Court of Appeals ruled that Walter had inflated his resume and committed perjury in the 1982 trial. A federal judge wrote that Walter was "a charlatan" and that "his testimony was, medically speaking, nonsense." The American Academy of Forensic Sciences (AAFS) twice investigated Drake's allegations against Walter and found Walter innocent of any wrongdoing. The Vidocq Society also investigated the allegations and pronounced Walter innocent. In the course of writing his book on the Vidocq Society, The Murder Room, author Michael Capuzzo investigated the allegations and claimed they were groundless. "Drake did what criminals do," Walter told Capuzzo in an interview. "He lied and tried to take advantage of people and the system. Justice took a holiday in this case, and I ended up with an undeserved scar of war with crime. Occasionally bottom-dwellers in the forensic community will try to exploit Drake's lies on the internet. But I've simply gone on to do some good work while choosing to avoid lawyers and chalk it up to 'life is not always fair'."

In May 2010, Drake received a new trial in Niagara County. He was convicted again and received a longer sentence, two consecutive terms of 25 years to life, The Buffalo News reported. Drake's second conviction was subsequently tossed because of "irrelevant and prejudicial" bite-mark evidence. In 2014, Drake pleaded to reduced charges and was released.
