= L. Fidelia Woolley Gillette =

Early American ordained female minister

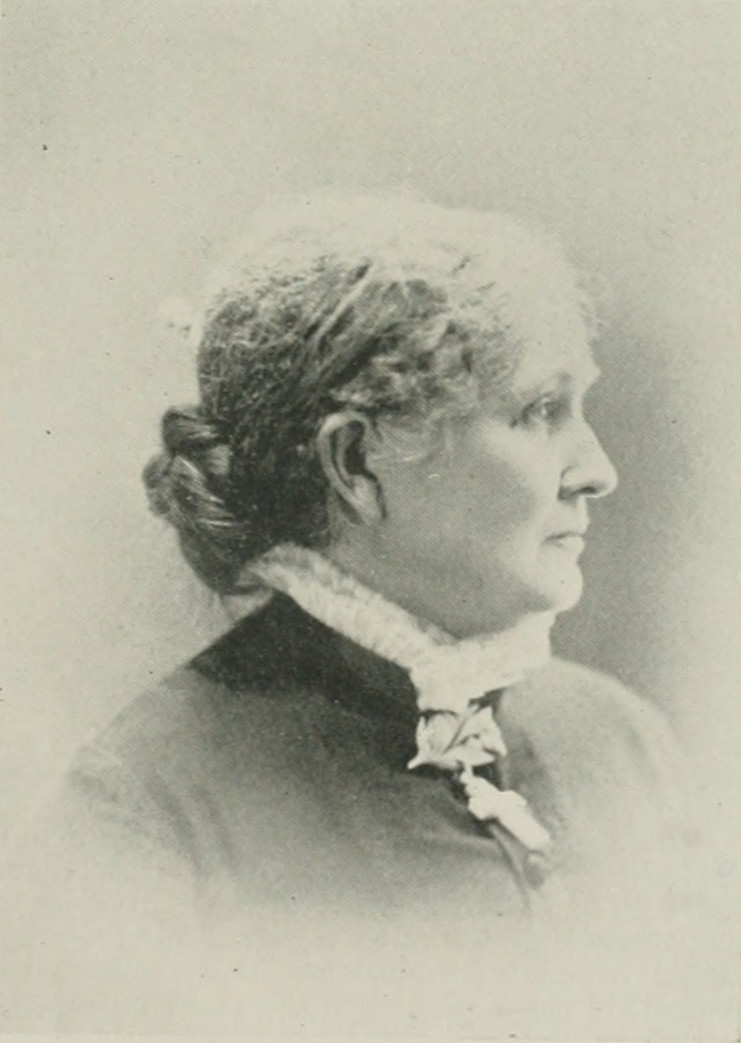
L. Fidelia Woolley Gillette

Reverend Lucia Fidelia Woolley Gillette (April 8, 1827 – October 14, 1905) was among the first women ordained Universalist minister in the United States and the first woman ordained of any denomination in Canada.

== Early life ==
Lucia Fidelia Woolley was born in Nelson, New York, on April 8, 1827. She was the daughter of Rev. Edward Mott Woolley and Laura Smith, and the oldest of a family of seven children. Her ancestry was English and French.

When Woolley was still a child the family moved often in the New York State: on her grandparents' farm in Cazenovia, New York, in Munnsville, New York, where her father opened a leather shop, and in 1841 in Bridgewater, New York, where her father was a Universalist minister.

Woolley was an extremely timid and sensitive child, but an enthusiast about her studies. Her father expected her, when she was a mere girl, to read books upon abstruse subjects and to be able to talk about them with himself and his friends, but the distinguishing characteristic of her childhood was spontaneous sympathy for every living thing and all her life it had made her the helper of the helpless and the friend "of such as are in bunds".

Woolley attended the Cazenovia Seminary and the Bridgewater Academy.

== Career ==
L. Fidelia Woolley Gillette's literary work started when she was 16 years old under the pen-names "Lyra" and "Carrie Russell", "Ruth Dinsmore" and her own name. Her poems and prose articles appeared in various papers and magazines.

In 1847, Woolley's father moved to a small farm near Birmingham, Michigan, ministering at Pontiac and Birmingham, and Wolley took a teaching position.

On August 21, 1873, Gillette obtained a license to preach and was ordained in 1877. She was among the first women ordained Universalist minister, Augusta Jane Chapin being the first on December 7, 1864, in Lansing, Michigan. In 1888 Gillette was the first woman ordained to preach of any denomination in Canada: she was ministering at the Universalist Church of Bloomfield, Prince Edward County, Ontario.

Gillette's published works are: "Pebbles From the Shore" (1879), "Floating Leaves" (1881), "Editorials and Other Waifs" (1889) and a memoir of her father, "Memoir of Rev. Edward Mott Woolley" (1855), who was a popular minister in the Universalist Church. There was a faint suggestion of the dramatic in Gillette's style of speaking that gave it charm; the elegance of her language, the richness of her imagery, the striking and original character of her illustrations was as refreshing as they were entertaining.

Gillette's missionary and pastoral work lasted several years. She wrote hymns, like: "Be True, Boys!", "The Beautiful World", "Come to My Kingdom", "I Will Not Forget, Our Father Is True" and "Jesus Leads Me Every Day".

Gillette lectured on women's issues, religious and literary issues, and campaigned for woman's suffrage. Gillette's lectures received high praise. In 1874 Gillette was selected to represent the Michigan State Woman Suffrage Association in Lansing. In October 1874, Gillette opened and closed the 6th annual meeting of the National Woman Suffrage Association in Detroit. She was the women's rights editor for the Rochester Era.

== Personal life ==
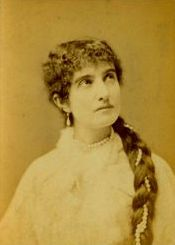
Florence Gillette, ca 1870s

On December 23, 1850, Fidelia Woolley married Hartson Gillette (1816–1886) and they had one daughter, Florence Lillian Gillette Flett (1851–1900), actress, dramatist and poet.

In the 1860s, Gillette moved with her family to Rochester, Michigan, where her husband ran the Rochester mill. In February 1864 Hartson Gillette enlisted in the 22nd Michigan Volunteer Infantry Regiment. In Rochester, Gillette helped founding the Rochester Woman's Club.

In 1873, Gillette's daughter, Florence, joined a theater company based in Chicago and later married Eugene Russell Soggs, an actor, on February 25, 1875. She married again, on July 9, 1889, to George A. Flett, a bookkeeper, and actor. She died on June 10, 1900, after five years of paresis, and her dying wish was to be buried in Southern California, which her mother accomplished: she is buried at Pomona, California. Florence Gillette was a protege of Charlotte Saunders Cushman and co-worker of George Vanderhof and Edwin Booth.

Gillette spent the last years of her life at the Messiah Universalist Home in Germantown, Philadelphia, and died on October 14, 1905, at Standing Stone Township, Pennsylvania. She is buried at Ivy Hill Cemetery, Philadelphia, together with her husband.
