= Steven Benson (murderer) =

American convicted double murderer

Steven Wayne Benson
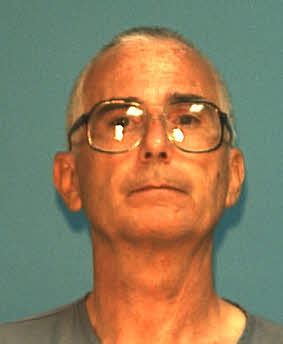
- DOC Mugshot
- Born: July 26, 1951; Baltimore, Maryland, U.S.
- Died: July 3, 2015 (aged 63); Perry, Florida, U.S.
- Spouses: Nancy Ferguson (m. 1972; div. 1979) Debra Franks Larsen Benson (m. 1980; div. 1993)
- Children: 3
- Parent(s): Margaret Benson (Deceased); Edward Benson (Deceased)
- Status: Deceased
- Convictions: First degree murder Attempted first degree murder Arson of a dwelling Arson
- Penalty: Life imprisonment

Details
- Victims: 2
- Date: July 9, 1985; Between 9:17 and 9:20 a.m.
- Country: United States
- State: Florida
- Locations: Quail Creek, Naples
- Target: Margaret Benson (mother)
- Injured: Carol Lynn Benson Kendall
- Weapon: Pipe bombs
- Date apprehended: August 22, 1985
- Imprisoned at: Taylor Correctional Institution

Steven Wayne Benson (July 26, 1951 – July 3, 2015) was an American convicted double murderer of his mother, tobacco heiress Margaret Benson, and his brother (actually his nephew but later adopted), tennis player Scott Benson. Margaret Hitchcock Benson was heiress of the Lancaster Leaf Tobacco Co., Lancaster, Pa., and had no connection with Benson & Hedges brand cigarettes manufactured in the US by Philip Morris.

On July 9, 1985, Benson placed a pipe bomb in the family car, in which Margaret, Scott, and Steven's sister, Carol Lynn Benson Kendall (a former Miss Florida runner-up), were waiting for Benson to join them when the Chevrolet Suburban exploded. Kendall survived but was badly burned; Margaret and Scott died instantly from the bomb blast. Represented by attorney Michael McDonnell, Steven Benson was ultimately convicted of first degree murder, attempted first degree murder, and arson of a dwelling. He avoided the death penalty, and was sentenced to two life terms in prison. Over the course of his sentence, Benson was transferred to various prisons because of constant threats and abuse from other inmates.

Benson died at Taylor Correctional Institution in Perry, Florida of a stab wound to the right side of the head with a homemade knife on July 3, 2015. Benson was in a long running feud with Cordell Washington, another inmate at the facility. The feud went back to at least 2012 after a series of assaults by Washington. Inmates told investigators that Washington planned to extort $1,000 from Benson within days after arriving at Taylor Correctional Institution. When Benson refused to pay, Washington and another man, identified as Marvin Taylor, ambushed and shanked Benson. Washington was charged with murder for killing Benson, but was acquitted.

== In media ==
Dominick Dunne's investigative crime show Dominick Dunne's Power, Privilege, and Justice devoted an hour for the case of Steven Benson. Benson is also featured in an episode of the New Detectives entitled "Short Fuse" (Season 2, Episode 3) and an episode of Florida Man Murders entitled "Killer Succession" (Season 1, Episode 3). The case was featured in Great Crimes and Trials and Infamous Murders. In addition, the Benson Family murder case was the subject of The Serpent's Tooth, a 1987 book by Christopher Andersen.
