= History's Mysteries =

- Created by: Patrick T. Gattis
- Presented by: Arthur Kent
- Narrated by: David Ackroyd
- Country of origin: United States
- No. of seasons: ~16
- No. of episodes: ~154

Production
- Running time: 6-7 hour

Original release
- Network: History Channel
- Release: 1998 – 2006

History's Mysteries is an American documentary television series that aired on the History Channel.

== Overview ==
The 154 episodes of the series were produced from 1998 to 2011. Each season consisted of 12 to 14 one-hour episodes that focused on historical events or subjects considered to be mysterious by the general public. Episodes typically begin with Kent giving a broad overview of the subject followed by what is commonly accepted as explanation. During the main segments, experts on both sides of the issue present their evidence and opinions. Before commercial breaks, Kent would give the audience bits of trivia relating to the subject; episodes also included a timeline which would give important events occurring around the time of the events discussed in the show.

Subjects covered on the show ranged from the beginning of human history to modern subjects such as Carlos the Jackal, The Amityville Horror, and Area 51, as well as political conspiracies and conspiracy theories such as MK ULTRA and the JFK Assassination. Common aspects of history covered on the show include religion, crime, the supernatural, archaeology, mythology, and folklore.

Some episodes of the show were repackaged as part of a series called "Incredible but True?", which aired episodes of History's Mysteries as well as other shows (including In Search of History and UFO Files, also narrated by Ackroyd). The show's last episodes were an anthology of clips from previous episodes (such as Mysteries of the High Seas).

Although new episodes are no longer being produced, re-runs of History's Mysteries are regularly shown on the History Channel. Additionally, they are available on DVD.

== Episode list ==
Notes: (alternate name); some of these names are exactly the same as Decoding the Past episodes.

=== Season 1 ===
Episode # - Original Air Date - Title

1. "The Death of Marilyn Monroe" (topic)
2. "Project Underworld: The Military and the Mafia" (topic)
3. "Navajo Code Talkers" (topic)
4. "The Wright Brothers Controversy" (topic)
5. 01-01-01 "Prophecies": Civilizations seek their destinies through prophetic visions. (topic)
6. "Hells Angels" (topic)
7. "Japan's Mysterious Pyramids" (topic)
8. "Ancient Aliens" (topic)
9. "Sodom and Gomorrah" (topic)

=== Season 2 ===
1. "Ghost Ships" ("The Mary Celeste"): Some of the Maritime's deep rooted mysteries are of ships that disappear only to reappear as ghostly apparitions upon the waves. Discusses famous "ghost ships" such as the Flying Dutchman, as well as derelict vessels like the Mary Celeste and Carroll A. Deering.
2. "Doomed Sisters of the Titanic": discusses the fate of the less famous sisters of the Titanic: HMHS Britannic and RMS Olympic.
3. "Chain Gangs" (topic)
4. "The True Story of Gladiators" (topic)
5. "Cain and Abel: A Murder Mystery" (topic)
6. "Shark Attack 1916" (topic)
7. "America's Stonehenge" (topic)
8. "The Holy Grail" (topic)
9. "The Civil War Draft Riots"
10. "The Five Points Gang" (topic)
11. "Hoax of the Ages: Piltdown Man"
12. "Roswell: Secrets Unveiled"
13. "Spies of the Revolutionary War"

=== Season 3 ===
Episode # - Original Air Date - Title

2. 06-13-01 "Fatima Secrets Unveiled": The Virgin Mary reveals three prophecies to children in 1917 Portugal. (topic)
3. "The Essex: The True Story of Moby Dick" (topic)
8. "Buried Treasure" (topic)

=== Season 4 ===
2. "The Shroud of Turin" (topic)
5. "The True Story of the Fighting Sullivans" (topic)
6. "The Search for Noah's Ark" (topic)
7. "Drake's Secret Voyage" (topic)
8. "The True Story of Mutiny on the Bounty" (topic)

=== Season 5 ===
7. "Secret Plunder: G.I. Looters" (topic)
8. "Raise the Hunley" (topic)

=== Season 6 ===
2. "Where's Jimmy Hoffa?: The Life and Disappearance of A Labor Legend" (topic)
3. "The Bloody Tower of London" (topic)
4. "Ghost Plane of the Desert: Lady Be Good" (topic)
10. "Amityville: Horror or Hoax?": examines investigations, both credulous and skeptical, of the Amityville haunting (topic)

=== Season 7 ===
1. "Amityville: The Haunting" (topic)
5. "Hitler's Perfect Children" (topic)
9. "Natural Mummies" (topic)

=== Season 8 ===
1. "Body Snatchers" (topic)
2. "The Onion Field With Joseph Wambaugh" (topic)
3. "FBI's Ten Most Wanted" (topic)
4. "Lost City of Atlantis" (topic)
5. "Dr. Guillotin and His Execution Machine" (topic)

=== Season 9 ===
6. "Vanished!": discusses the mysterious disappearances of individuals during the 20th Century, including Judge Crater and D. B. Cooper.
8. "Alaska's Bermuda Triangle" - Alaska natives say that shape-shifting spirits kidnap lost travelers.

=== Season 10 ===
1. "Mysteries of Easter Island"

=== Season 11 ===
7. "The Spanish Armada"

=== Season 12 ===
1. "The True Story of Braveheart"
2. "The Hunt for Jack the Ripper"
3. "Amazon Women"
7. "Secret Societies"
8. "Exorcising the Devil"
10. "Crypts, Coffins and Corpses"

=== Season 13 ===
1. "Superstitions"
4. "Carlos the Jackal"
10. "Devil's Island: Hell on Earth"

=== Season 14 ===
Episode # - Original Air Date - Title

3. "The Strange Case of Lizzie Borden"
4. 12-04-00 "Circus Freaks and Sideshows": Circus and sideshow performers share their memories of the magical midway.
5. "The True Story of Rasputin"
7. "The Real Dr. Crippen"
8. "The Bible Code: Predicting Armageddon"
9. 11-14-00 "Nazi Ghost Train": The Resistance prevents Nazis from sending a train full of prisoners to Germany.
10. "Cults"

=== Season 15 ===
2. "Silent Witnesses: The Kitty Genovese Murder"
3. "Vikings, Fury from the North"
4. "Smallpox: Deadly Again?"
5. "The Children's Crusade"
6. "The Inquisition"
7. "Samurai Warrior"
8. "The True Story of Rob Roy"
10. "Ancient Monster Hunters": The cyclops, Amazon warriors, and the ferocious griffin may have a place in the fossil record.

=== Season 16 ===
2. "Monsters of the Sea": Huge and mysteries sea animals breaking the surface have always been part of sailors' folklore.
3. "Nazi Bomb": How close were the Nazis to developing an atomic bomb? Focus on Werner Heisenberg's involvement in interviews with Hans Bethe.
16. "Contaminated: The Karen Silkwood Story"

=== Season unknown ===
Episode # - Original Air Date - Title

- "Terror in the Heartland: The Black Legion"
- "The True Story of The Untouchables"
- "Quantrill's Raiders"
- "Judas: Traitor or Friend?" (topic)
- "Failed Assassinations": focuses on failed assassination attempts on US Presidents, including Andrew Jackson, Theodore Roosevelt, Gerald Ford, and Ronald Reagan.
- "The Mysterious Howard Hughes"
- "The Abominable Snowman"
- "U.S. Invaded!"
- "Killer Submarine"
- "Alamo Scouts"
- "The Mysteries of King Tut"
- "Salem Witch Trials"
- "The True Story of the Philadelphia Experiment"
- "Secret Brotherhood of Freemasons"
- "Ancient City: Found and Lost"
- "The FBI Celebrity Files"
- "The Cavemen"
- "Werewolves": The werewolf myth holds a prominent place in history.
- "Roman Roads: Paths to Empire"
- "The End of the World"
- "Where is Jimmy Hoffa?"
- "Jack Ruby on Trial": discusses Jack Ruby and explores the possibility of a conspiracy to kill John F. Kennedy.
- "Vigilantes"
- "Area 51: Beyond Top Secret"
- "The Occult and the Third Reich"
- "Witchcraft"
- "Zombies"
- "The Real Dracula"
- "The Boy Who Gave Away the Bomb"
- "The Hitler Youth"
- "The Real Robinson Crusoe"
- "Tales of the FBI: Operation Solo"
- "Cliff Mummies of the Andes: Unwrapped
- "Secrets of the Dinosaur Hunters"
- "The Mafia at War": discusses the US government's efforts to enlist the Mafia for assistance in fighting World War II.
- "San Quentin"
- "King Herod's Lost City"
- "Lost Colony of Roanoke"
- "Secret UFO Files": examines the modern era of UFO sightings, and the US governments reaction to and knowledge of the subject.
- "Ship of Gold"
- "The Legacy of Al Capone"
- "Infamous Murders: Horror on the Highways"
- "Infamous Murders: Mass Murders"
- "A Question of Conspiracy: The RFK Murder"
- "Infamous Murders: Trapped by Forensics"
- "Infamous Murders: Intent on Murder"
- "Infamous Murders: Streets of Fear"
- "Infamous Murders: The Cannibals"
- "Infamous Murders: New York MAFIA Murders - Nugus/Martin Productions - 2001"
- "Outlaws: The Ten Most Wanted"
- "Infamous Murders: Stalking the Innocent"
- "Organized Crime: A World History: Sicily"
- "Alcatraz"
- "Sex in the Real West"
- 06-19-01 "The War Illusionist": A British magician fools Hitler's generals and pilots.
- "Infamous Murders: Killing for Thrills"
- "The Enduring Mystery of Stonehenge": It stands on a wide plain in southern England, a circular formation of over 160 massive stones, creating an endless mystery for historians.
- "The Mysteries of Devil's Triangles": discusses unexplained disappearances of ships and planes in the Bermuda Triangle and the Great Lakes. Focuses particularly on Flight 19 and the Edmund Fitzgerald.
- 01-17-03 "England's Lost Castles": Timber castles dot England during the Middle Ages.
- "The Knights of Camelot"
- "England's Great Wall"
- "Scotland Yard's Greatest Investigations"
- "Asteroids"
- "The Greensboro Massacre"
- "Bigfoot and Other Monsters": examines popular subjects of cryptozoology, including Bigfoot, Mokele mbembe, the chupacabra, and others.
- "Crop Circle Controversy"
- "Infamous Murders: The Poisoners"
- "The Loch Ness Monster"
- "The Odessa File"
- "Bounty Hunters: Relentless Pursuers"
- "The Most Ancient Taboo: Cannibalism"
- "The Great Train Robbery"
- "Born Killers: Leopold and Loeb"
- "Roswell: Final Declassification"
- "Alien Hunters"
- "The Search for Life on Mars"
- "The Manson Family Murders"
- 10-25-00 "The Roman Emperors": The heads of Ancient Rome lead lives of increasing depravity.
- "Infamous Murders: Women Who Kill"
- "A Secret Story"
- "American-Italian Internment: A Secret Story"
- "Lost Worlds"
- "Mysteries on the High Seas"
- "Monsters"
- "Miracles, Mystics, and Prophecies"
- "Mysteries of the Bible"
- "Buried Secrets: Digging For DNA"
- "The Catacombs of Rome"
- "Getting High: A History of LSD"
- "Hidden Tomb of Antiochus"
- "History of Prostitution: Sex in the City"
- "Human Bondage"
- "Mind Control: America's Secret War": discusses MK ULTRA and other Cold War projects to create mind-controlling substances.
- "Ancient Drugs": Humans indulge in many frightening and often toxic substances; altered states of consciousness, shamanism, trance dancing, mind-altering substances, visions, soma, wine, beer, opium, Demeter cult (Mysteries of Elysis), alcohol, chocolate, tobacco, coca, San Pedro cactus rites (mescalin), cocaine, heroin, ayahuasca; features interviews with Douglas Sharon (Director of San Diego Museum of Man), Huston Smith, Andrew Weil, professor Carole Fontaine (Andover Newton Theological School), Wade Davis, artist Pablo Amaringo
- 08-09-03 "UFOs: Then and Now?: Nightmare": Alien abductions.
