= Ivy Hill Cemetery (Philadelphia) =

Historic cemetery in Philadelphia, Pennsylvania

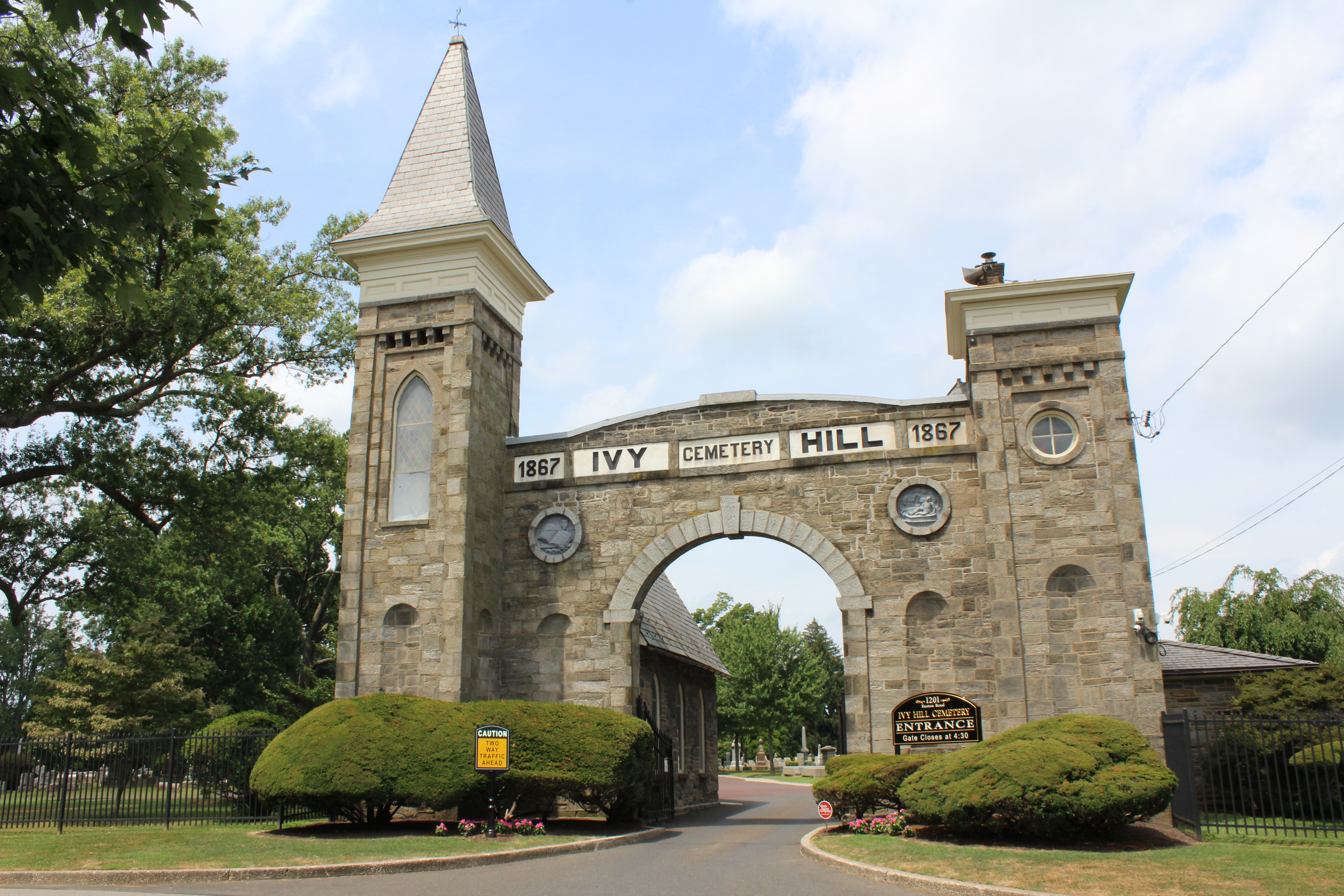
- Ivy Hill Cemetery gate and chapel
- Interactive map of Ivy Hill Cemetery

Details
- Established: 1867
- Location: Cedarbrook, Philadelphia, Pennsylvania
- Country: United States
- Coordinates: 40°04′32″N 75°10′51″W
- Type: private, non-sectarian
- Owned by: Ivy Hill Cemetery Company
- Size: 80 acres
- Website: ivyhillcemetery.org
- Find a Grave: Ivy Hill Cemetery

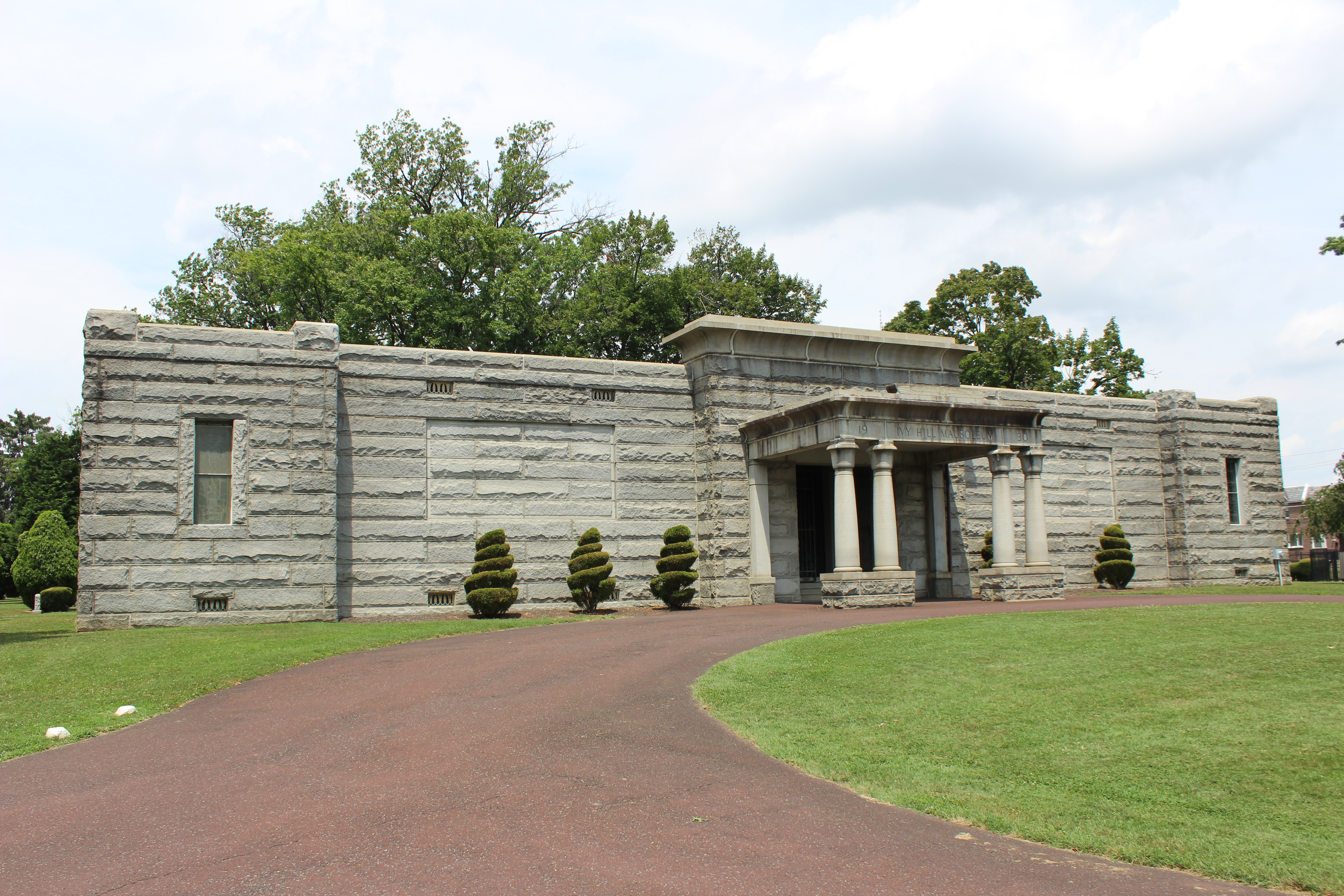
1930 mausoleum at Ivy Hill Cemetery

Ivy Hill Cemetery is a public cemetery and crematorium located at 1201 Easton Road in the Cedarbrook neighborhood of Philadelphia, Pennsylvania. Chartered in 1867, it is 80 acres in size and was originally named the Germantown and Chestnut Hill Cemetery. It was renamed Ivy Hill Cemetery in June 1871.

The gatehouse is a grand gothic archway and contains a farmhouse chapel.

One cremation unit was installed in 1985 and the number has been expanded to include six cremation units.

One of the notable monuments in the cemetery is of Melville H. Freas. He fought in the American Civil War as a member of the 150th Pennsylvania Infantry Regiment and commissioned a life-size statue of himself in his military uniform to adorn his grave.

== Notable burials ==
- H.W. Ambruster (1879–1961), Rutgers University football coach
- William Law Anderson (1879–1910), professional golfer
- Bill Byrd (1907–1991), professional baseball player
- George Potter Darrow (1859–1943), U.S. congressman
- Mahlon Duckett (1922–2015), professional baseball player
- Charles Edgar Duryea (1861–1939), automotive engineer and inventor
- "Smokin' Joe" Frazier (1944–2011), professional boxer
- L. Fidelia Woolley Gillette (1827–1905), first woman ever ordained a minister in Canada
- Franklin B. Gowen (1836–1889), businessman
- Bill Gray (1871–1932), professional baseball player
- Harold B. Hairston (1940–2016), Philadelphia fire commissioner
- Ed Lafitte (1886–1971), professional baseball player
- Margaret Lawrence (1889–1929), actress
- Thomas McIntosh (1921–2005), Philadelphia city councilman
- Harold Melvin (1939–1997), soul singer
- Acel Moore (1940–2016), Philadelphia Inquirer editor
- Edwin Ward Moore (1810–1865), commodore of the Texas Navy
- Matthew Saad Muhammad (1954–2014), professional boxer
- Francis D. Pastorius (1920–1962), Philadelphia City Treasurer
- Fayette Pinkney (1948–2009), soul singer
- Joni Sledge (1956–2017), pop and disco singer
- William Thompson Russell Smith (1812–1896), landscape painter
- Bill Tilden (1893–1953), professional tennis player
- Lauretha A. Vaird (1952–1996), Philadelphia police officer
- Louis Wagner (1838–1914), U.S. Army general
- Marion Williams (1927–1994), gospel singer
- Joseph Augustus Zarelli (1953–1957), child murder victim known as the "boy in the box"
