= Death of Mary Jane Barker =

American girl who died accidentally in 1957

Mary Jane Barker
- Born: February 28, 1953; Bellmawr, New Jersey, U.S.
- Disappeared: February 25, 1957 (aged 3); Bellmawr, New Jersey, U.S.
- Died: c. March 3, 1957 (aged 4); Bellmawr, New Jersey, U.S.
- Cause of death: Starvation
- Burial place: Bellmawr, New Jersey, U.S.
- Father: Frank Barker

On February 25, 1957, Mary Jane Barker, an American 4-year-old girl from Bellmawr, New Jersey, went missing along with her playmate's dog. After an extensive search throughout the city, dubbed by the press as "the largest search in South Jersey", her dead body was discovered by her playmate in the closet of a vacant house near her home on March 3. The dog bounded out of the closet, seemingly unharmed.

Despite the initial suspicion of foul play, the death was ruled an accident; a case of starvation and exposure as Barker was unable to escape the closet. Investigators concluded that Barker died on February 28, three days after her disappearance. As a result, the mayor ordered closet doors to open more easily. The press surrounding the Barker case also led to the first calls about the "Boy in the Box".

== Birth and siblings ==
Mary Jane Barker was born in Bellmawr, New Jersey, U.S., on February 28, 1953, to Mr. and Mrs. Frank Barker. She had two older siblings: Carol Ann, 8 years older; and Frank Jr., 6 years older.

== Disappearance ==
Barker disappeared along with a four-month old black spaniel puppy at 10:30 a.m. on Monday, February 25, 1957, in Bellmawr. She was last seen playing in a nearby yard, going to meet with her friend and neighbor, 6-year-old Maria Freitta, the owner of the dog. Police were notified by 1:30 p.m. She was presumed kidnapped, and the next day footprints were found along a nearby stream bank which seemed to be those of a man, child, and dog. The police stated that the small footprints in the mud matched the size of Barker's shoes.

=== Search ===
Her disappearance "touched off an intensive search for a kidnapper or murderer" according to The Philadelphia Inquirer. It was called "the largest search in South Jersey." Hundreds of volunteers and police searched the city. On the first night more than 200 civilians did a foot-by-foot search. Eventually well over a thousand people were involved. Her fourth birthday (February 28) came and went with no sign of her.

On Wednesday, February 27, the parents made an appeal on television to anyone who may have kidnapped Barker, asking them to "leave the child in the nearest church." Vern Lovering, a 43-year old floor sander and convicted child molester, had been questioned, and said he was near the Barker home. On Thursday, February 28, the Federal Bureau of Investigation (FBI) conducted its own search, and the next day again questioned Lovering after police received a phone call demanding $500 ransom. Police made an appeal to the kidnapper not to "act in haste or do harm to the child."

The grief of the Barker family was especially acute on February 28 and March 1 since those were the birthdays of Barker and her father, and they were planning to have a joint celebration that week. The police stated that they were working on several leads but had no developments. On Saturday, March 2, the FBI was officially called in following the provisions of the Federal Kidnapping Act. Several nearby dumps were searched to no avail.

== Discovery of body ==
On Sunday, March 3, Maria Freitta, the owner of the dog and the playmate of Barker, went with her mother to a vacant, newly built ranch house next door to her home. It was on 433 2nd Ave, owned by her aunt and uncle, Mr. and Mrs. Pat Vecchia. Maria managed to open a 3-by-5-foot (0.91 m × 1.52 m) bedroom closet door, and her missing dog bounded out of the closet and came to her. Also in the closet was Barker, dead, in a seated position, the hood of her blue coat partially covering her blonde hair. She was found in the same clothes she had on when she disappeared. Bits of fur from her hat were rubbed off. Police Chief Edward Garrity stated he believed that Barker had recently been placed in the closet as the puppy had been fed recently, and there was no animal waste in the closet despite the dog not being housebroken.

During previous searches, including a visit by a repairman, no dog was heard. The house had been searched three times before, but the bedroom closet where her body was found was not searched. Rev. Harry McIntyre looked in bedroom closets on February 26, but it never occurred to him to search the front-bedroom closet. "I concentrated on the basement, believing the girl might have fallen down the stairs," he said. A volunteer fireman, John Reeves, also searched the first-floor bedroom but not the closet. Barker may have been too frightened to cry out.

The lock on the closet door.

Although the door was unlocked, a thumb screw inside apparently made it difficult for a child to open. The door had a knob on the outside, but only a small turn latch on the inside.

== Autopsy findings ==
On March 4, the autopsy indicated Barker had nothing in her system except some chocolate milk the morning of her disappearance, and had not eaten since she vanished. There was no indication of foul play; no signs of violence or sexual molestation. It was found she must have lived in the closet for three days without food or drink. An inspection of the closet showed marks from her attempt to escape.

It was found the dog was with her the whole time. The dog was "alive and frisky", which initially led investigators to believe she had been in the closet only a short time. The dog was first taken to a local veterinarian for study, but he concluded that it was possible that the dog had to be put down to examine its stomach contents. Dr. Robert Sauer, the veterinarian, stated that the survival of the dog for several days was consistent with the stamina of such an animal. On March 4, the dog was euthanized to allow veterinarians from the University of Pennsylvania to examine its stomach contents, and establish why the dog outlived Barker. Investigators wanted to know if the dog was without food or water since Barker's disappearance.

Camden County Coroner Robert J. Blake ruled her death an accident, a case of starvation with exposure as a contributing factor. A spokesman for the coroner said Barker became trapped in the closet, and died of fright and starvation. Due to a hole in the closet, she could not have suffocated.

== Aftermath ==
On March 7, Mayor Cornelius Devennel ordered all closet doors to be equipped with special knobs that could be opened easily from both inside and outside. This order was made mandatory for all new home constructions or reconstructions. A ceremony in her memory was held at the St. Francis de Sales Church that same day. On March 20, radio station WPEN presented Maria Freitta with a new puppy, an English Setter.

=== Boy in the Box ===
The press surrounding the Barker case led to the first calls about the Boy in the Box. The college student who discovered the boy had intended not to call the police until he heard reports of the Barker case on his car radio.

== See also ==
- List of solved missing person cases
- List of unusual deaths in the 20th century
