= Vidocq Society =

Crime-solving club in Philadelphia, US

The Vidocq Society is a crime-solving club in Philadelphia, Pennsylvania.

== Origin of name ==
The Society is named for Eugène-François Vidocq, 19th century pioneer French criminologist and first private detective, who helped police by using the psychology of the criminal to solve cold case homicides. A former criminal himself, he created the private detective agency, and is considered to be one of the fathers of modern criminology for his numerous innovations: invention of indelible ink and unalterable bond paper and the introduction of undercover work and ballistics; a record keeping system for criminal investigation and the first ever plaster cast impressions of shoe prints

The Society holds regular meetings where law enforcement officials from around the world present cold cases for review.

== Membership ==
Members are forensic professionals: current and former FBI profilers, homicide investigators, scientists, psychologists, prosecutors and coroners who use their experience to provide new insights for investigations that have gone cold. Membership is capped at 82, one for each year of Vidocq's life.

== History ==
The Society was formed in 1990 by William Fleisher, Richard Walter, and Frank Bender. It solved its first case in 1991, clearing an innocent man of involvement in the murder of Huey Cox in Little Rock, Arkansas. In addition to the investigation of the 1957 murder of Joseph Augustus Zarelli ("Boy in the Box"), the Society was involved in solving the murder of Terri Brooks. Some law enforcement agencies doubt the efficacy of their work.

== Criteria for cases ==
Vidocq will only consider cases that meet certain requirements: they must be unsolved deaths more than two years old and the case must be formally presented to them by the appropriate law enforcement agency.

== See also ==
- Operation Identify Me – Interpol investigation
