= Frank Bender =

American forensic artist

- Born: Francis Augustus Bender; June 16, 1941; Philadelphia, Pennsylvania
- Died: July 28, 2011 (aged 70); Philadelphia, Pennsylvania
- Occupations: Forensic artist, sculptor
- Website: frankbender.us

Francis Augustus Bender (June 16, 1941 – July 28, 2011) was a forensic artist and fine artist. He made facial reconstructions of the dead based on their skeletons, and of fugitives based on outdated photographs, with his reconstructions showing how they might look in the present day. He primarily worked in clay and then cast his pieces into plaster and painted them, but he also created age-progression drawings of fugitives using pastels. His most famous facial reconstruction case was that of murderer John Emil List, who, after decades as a fugitive under a false identity, was captured a few days after Bender's bust of him was featured on America's Most Wanted.

== Career ==
An autodidact, Bender originally began his forensic work when, impoverished, he worked out a deal with the Philadelphia coroner to be allowed to study some of their unknown dead bodies in an effort to improve his sculpting skills. He also created life-sized monuments in bronze for the African Burial Ground National Monument in New York (using three of the actual skulls found on the site to give faces to the unknown slaves who had been buried there), a monument for slain police officers in New Jersey, and a Holocaust obelisk.

Bender was one of the founding members of the Vidocq Society, along with William Fleisher and Richard Walter. The Vidocq Society, named after Eugène François Vidocq, meets in Philadelphia, Pennsylvania and focuses on solving cold cases.

== Death ==
In 2009, Bender was diagnosed with pleural mesothelioma, a rare cancer that attacks the lining of the lungs and is caused by prolonged exposure to asbestos. Bender believed he was exposed to it during his time in the Navy working in the engine room. Bender died on July 28, 2011, at his home in Philadelphia.

== In popular culture ==
On May 13, 2008, Random House published The Girl with the Crooked Nose by Ted Botha, a book on Bender's life story intertwined with his most challenging case: the female homicides in Ciudad Juárez.

In August 2010, Penguin Books published The Murder Room by Michael Capuzzo in which Frank Bender is a central figure—the book includes a biography of Bender and focuses on the work of the Vidocq Society.
