= Cedarbrook, Philadelphia =

Cedarbrook
- Neighborhood of Philadelphia
- Location within Philadelphia
- Country: United States
- State: Pennsylvania
- County: Philadelphia
- City: Philadelphia
- Area codes: 215, 267 and 445

Cedarbrook is a neighborhood located in the Northwest section of the City of Philadelphia, Pennsylvania, United States.

The Ivy Hill neighborhood comprises roughly the northwestern half of Cedarbrook. Ivy Hill Cemetery (established 1867) forms the geographic heart of the neighborhood. (The neighborhood most likely takes its name from the cemetery [rather than vice versa], as the area was woods and farmland when the cemetery was established.) Ivy Hill Road is sometimes mistakenly restyled as "Ivyhill Road"—most notably on its own newest street signs.

== Geography ==
=== Boundaries ===
- Cheltenham Avenue to the northeast (a county line and city limit, beyond which lies Cheltenham Township, Montgomery County);
- Ivy Hill Road to the northwest (a county line and city limit, beyond which lies Wyndmoor, Springfield Township, Montgomery County)
- Washington Lane to the southeast (beyond which lies West Oak Lane).
- Mt Airy to the southwest, though the border blends with East Mt Airy and is never exactly defined. Many residents residing in zip code 19150 see themselves as part of East Mt Airy.

== Demographics ==
According to the 2000 US Census, the neighborhood has a total population of 25,274. The median household income is $42,342; the median family income is $49,508. The racial makeup of the neighborhood was 2.2% White, 95.3% Black or African-American, 0.2% Alaskan or Native American, 0.0% Native Hawaiian or Pacific Islander, and 1.8% from two or more races. Hispanic or Latino of any race accounted for 1.1% of the population. Approximately 10% of the population lives below the poverty line.
