= Murder of Terri Brooks =

1984 murder in the United States

Coordinates: 40.1805°N 74.8693°W

- Location: Bucks County, Pennsylvania, U.S.
- Date: February 4, 1984; 42 years ago
- Attack type: Homicide
- Victims: Terri Brooks, aged 25
- Perpetrator: Alfred Scott Keefe
- Sentence: Life in prison without the possibility of parole

Terri Brooks (December 9, 1958 – February 4, 1984) was the night manager of a Roy Rogers in Bucks County, Pennsylvania when she was murdered in 1984 by her fiancé Alfred Scott Keefe, who subsequently confessed. Her murder was not solved until 1999. On June 6, 2000, Keefe was sentenced to life in prison without the possibility of parole.

Brooks' murder was featured in Michael Capuzzo's The Murder Room, which profiled the Vidocq Society.

The case was covered in many true crime shows, such as: Cold Case Files, The New Detectives, Dead of Night, An Unexpected Killer and Mr Ballen Podcast.
