= Anthony Sully =

American serial killer (1944–2023)

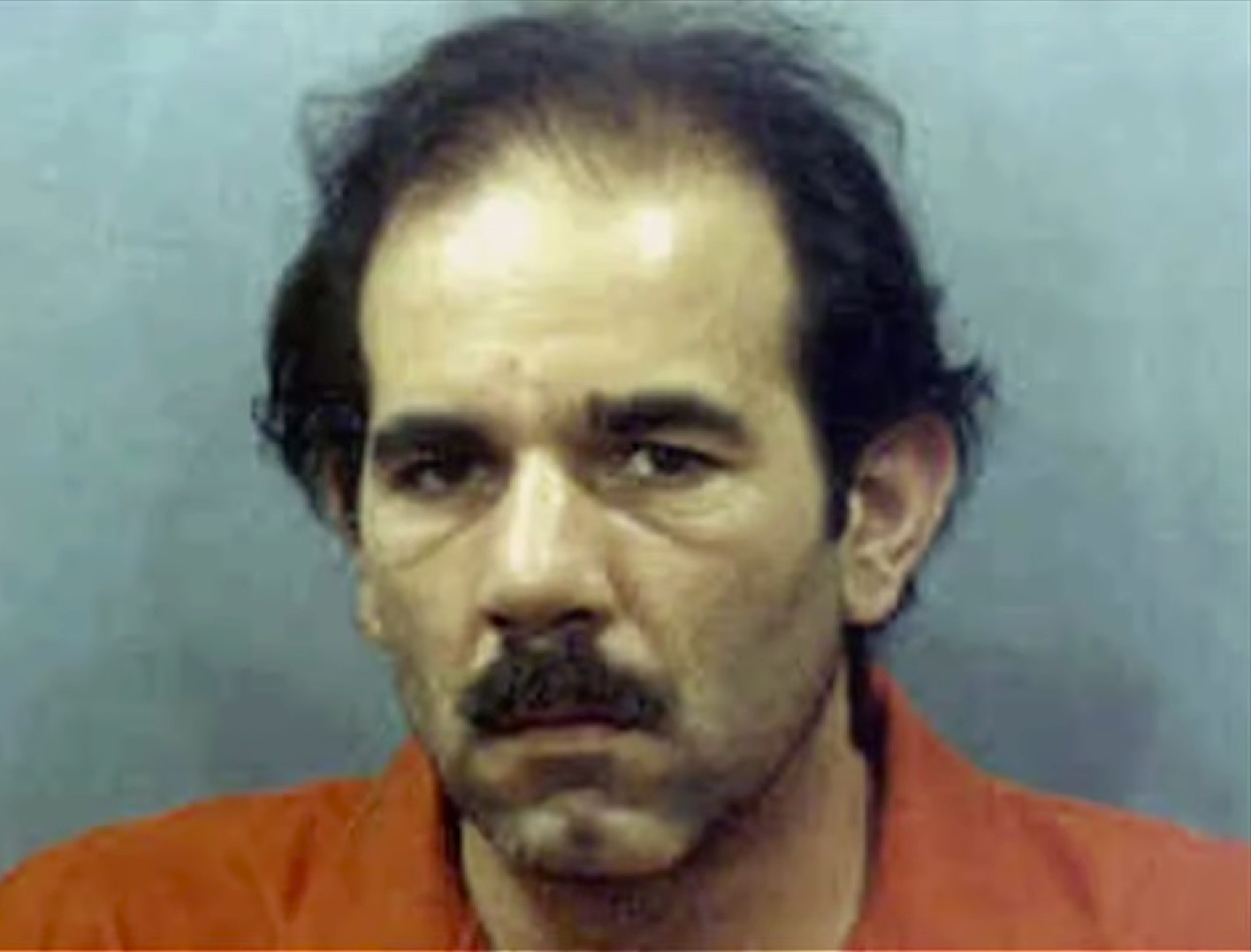
- Sully in a 1983 police mugshot
- Born: Anthony John Sully; January 2, 1944; San Francisco, California, U.S.
- Died: September 8, 2023 (aged 79); San Quentin, California, U.S.
- Other name: "Jack"
- Conviction: First degree murder with special circumstances (6 counts)
- Penalty: Death

Details
- Victims: 6
- Span of crimes: February – August 1983
- Country: United States
- State: California
- Date apprehended: August 25, 1983
- Imprisoned at: San Quentin State Prison, San Quentin, California

Anthony John Sully (January 2, 1944 – September 8, 2023) was an American serial killer and police officer responsible for the murders of six people between February and August 1983 at his warehouse in Burlingame, California. Sully placed some of the corpses of his victims in metal drums and poured concrete over them, after which he dumped them in Golden Gate Park. At least three people acted as his accomplices in the crimes. Sully was found guilty of the killings in July 1986, and was sentenced to death.

== Early life ==
Anthony John Sully was born on January 2, 1944, in San Francisco, California. He spent his childhood and adolescence in the city of Millbrae, where he graduated from a local high school. In the early 1960s, Sully met Elizabeth Ann, whom he married in 1965. After the wedding, he developed an interest in law enforcement, and Sully applied for a job with the police department in Millbrae, becoming a police officer the following year. From 1966 to 1974, he served in the Patrol and Post Service, during which he had a clean record and was described positively by colleagues. Around this time, his behavior began to change, and in 1969, his wife filed for divorce, claiming that she had been physically abused by Sully for four years.

In 1974, he married a second time to a woman named Donna, but after only 15 months, she divorced him due to his constant physical assaults, in addition to the courts issuing a restraining order on Sully to not approach her, her child or her relatives. She also mentioned an incident that occurred following their separation, in which Sully twisted the heads of her daughter's ducklings and threatened to do the same to her child.

After quitting the police department, Sully decided to start his own business in the late 1970s. He began working as an electrical and construction contractor, for which he rented a hangar in Burlingame, which he used as a warehouse. In the early 1980s, Sully developed an increased sexual appetite towards women, and began to spend a lot of time in the company of pimps and prostitutes, to whom he introduced himself as "Jack". Subsequently, Sully invested several thousand dollars in the creation of one of the escort agencies, and began using drugs.

== Murders ==
In 1982, Sully met 32-year-old Tina Livingston, the owner of a local escort agency. One of the girls who worked for Livingston, 24-year-old Gloria Fravel, could not repay her $500 debt, and then tried to escape. In early February 1983, Livingston and another sex worker, 23-year-old Keli "Angel" Burns, located Fravel in San Francisco and then took her to Sully's warehouse in Burlingame. When all three arrived at the warehouse, Sully offered to have sex with Fravel, which she refused. He then proceeded to beat the girl and took her to the back of the warehouse, where he handcuffed her and hung her from the ceiling. For the next two days, he kept Fravel in the warehouse, where he tortured and sexually assaulted her, while Livingston and Burns were in another part of the hangar. During one of the torture sessions, Sully tied a hangman's knot and hung it around her neck. Most of the time, Fravel was drugged with cocaine, but one time, Sully lost control of the situation, allowing Fravel to free herself from the gag and begin screaming. Livingston and Burns unsuccessfully tried to replace the gag and silence her, after which Sully came in and strangled her with a rope. With his accomplices' help, he placed her body in the car, and then, together with Burns, left the warehouse to dump it. During the trip, Fravel regained consciousness, as a result of which the pair stopped the car on the side of the road. Sully then hit Fravel several times on the head with an axe, killing her. The pair then disposed of her body near State Route 35, where it was discovered on February 7. Sully is said to have kept a newspaper article reporting the discovery of her body as a trophy, and had thought it was "hilarious" that she had been found by a butcher.

Soon after Fravel's murder, Sully asked Livingston to bring a girl who is not a prostitute, but would still agree to provide him with sexual services in exchange for money. A few days later, Livingston called Sully and told him about 19-year-old Brenda Oakden, a roommate of one of her escorts. Oakden, who ran away from her home in Huntington Beach in the early 1980s, was a fan of punk rock who occasionally engaged in prostitution under the name "Brenda Rule". In mid-February, Oakden was taken to Sully's warehouse in Burlingame, where he shot her in the back of the head with a .38 caliber revolver. After the murder, at the request of Sully, Livingston spread a rumor among Oakden's friends and acquaintances that she boarded a bus and left San Francisco towards an unknown direction.

Sully's next victims were a 24-year-old pimp, Michael Thomas, and his 20-year-old common-law wife, Phyllis Melendez. Thomas had a criminal record for robbery and drug possession dating back to 1977, while Melendez was a prostitute who had been arrested for prostitution on five occasions in 1982. In early 1983, Thomas and Sully had an argument, and so, in April of that year, Sully invited the pair to his hangar, where he shot both in the back of the head shortly after their arrival. He then placed the corpses of Oakden, Thomas and Melendez in 55-gallon drums, filling them with concrete and then dropping them in Golden Gate Park on April 29, where they were found a few days later by patrolman Bruno Pezzulich.

Sully's next victim was 22-year-old Barbara Searcy, an ex-girlfriend. In August 1983, he called the girl with an offer to meet and give her financial assistance, to which she agreed. After Searcy entered the hangar, she was shot in the back of the head with his revolver. Soon after, Sully gave all of her clothes and personal belongings to Livingston, as payment for the latter to go into Searcy's apartment and erase the message left on her answering machine telling her to come over to his place, but Livingston was unable to enter the apartment. Sully then wrapped up Searcy's body in transparent plastic sheets, and with Livingston's help, roped the body to his car, dragging it along Woodside and dumped it near the Pulgas Water Temple, where it was discovered on August 18.

Sully's final victim was 24-year-old drug dealer Kathryn Barrett, who was invited to his hangar at the end of August 1983, ostensibly to sell him 6 ounces of cocaine. There, with the help of 20-year-old Michael Anthony Francis, Sully attacked Barrett, stabbing her six times in the chest and hitting her several times on the head with a sledgehammer. On August 19, the girl's naked body, wrapped in plastic bags, was found on a street in South San Francisco's industrial district.

== Arrest ==
Anthony Sully was arrested on August 25, 1983, after investigators positively matched his fingerprints to those found on the barrels containing the bodies of Thomas, Oakden and Melendez. In addition to the fingerprints left on the barrel's surface, Sully and Burns' handprints were found on the concrete as well. Following his arrest, the police officers searched Sully's car and hangar, where they found that the barrels had been stolen from another nearby hangar. While examining the suspect's car, plastic bags were found that had an identical structural defect to those with which Michael Thomas' body had been wrapped up in, as well as a white cotton rope. With the help of forensic technology, it was established that this same rope had been used to tie up the limbs of Barbara Searcy. While combing through the hangar, police also found a pack of Benson & Hedges-brand cigarettes, the batch of which corresponded to the number of smoked cigarette butts found on the body of Kathryn Barrett. After Sully was arrested, Tina Livingston contacted law enforcement, confessing her complicity in the crimes and testified against her cohorts, leading to the additional arrests of Keli Burns and Michael Francis. In October 1983, Anthony Sully was charged with the six murders, but pleaded not guilty on all counts.

== Trial ==
On June 3, 1986, Sully was found guilty on all counts by jury verdict, on the basis of which, just twelve days later, he was sentenced to death. After the announcement of the verdict, Sully made a 40-minute speech professing his innocence.

His main accomplice, Tina Livingston, accepted a plea deal with the San Mateo County Attorney's Office: in exchange for a lighter sentence, she would act as a key witness for the prosecution and give detailed testimony on each case, for which she would be charged with negligent homicide. Livingston was convicted in the summer of 1986 and sentenced to three years imprisonment, but was released with time served as, by the time of the court decision, she had been imprisoned since her arrest in August 1983. Michael Francis was convicted as an accomplice in the Barrett murder in January 1986, and sentenced to life imprisonment with a chance of parole after 25 years; the same punishment was given to Sully's last accomplice, Keli Burns, who was convicted in the murders of Thomas, Melendez and Oakden.

== Aftermath ==
Sully was housed in San Quentin State Prison's death row. He requested a commutation of his sentence twice, in 1991 and 2013, as well as for a new trial, but all of his appeals were dismissed.

Michael Francis continued to serve his sentence at the High Desert State Prison. He became eligible for parole in 2004 and has been denied several times due to repeated rule infractions and violations while incarcerated, including a 1997 conviction for assaulting a fellow inmate. He waived his right to a parole hearing in 2020 and was automatically denied parole for five years as a result.

Sully's other imprisoned accomplice, Keli Burns, was granted parole and released at the end of 2016, after spending more than 33 years in prison.

== Death ==
Prior to his death, Sully suffered from an unspecified form of cancer and had been in declining health. Sully died of natural causes at a medical facility on the morning of September 8, 2023, at the age of 79.

The morning of Sully's death, the Marin County Coroner made an official notification by telephone to Kent Nielsen of Atascadero, California– the only person listed as an emergency contact. The coroner's phone call was followed by a formal visit by an Atascadero police officer.

Nielsen later told CBS News he and his wife, Debbie "DJ" Nielsen, had regularly visited Sully over the previous 20 years and exchanged hundreds of cards and letters during that period. Kent Nielsen met Sully in 1969 when Nielsen was 16 and worked at the Mobil service station in Millbrae that serviced patrol cars for the Millbrae police department. Sully was a 25-year-old Millbrae police officer at the time and the two became friends, but drifted apart after Sully left the police department in 1974.

Out of curiosity, Nielsen reconnected with Sully at San Quentin in 2002, but despite their many meetings over the next two decades, Nielsen never actually asked Sully why he committed the murders. In a story broadcast by CBS in November 2023, Nielsen said he was certain Sully would have told him everything and expressed some regret for not asking.

== See also ==
- List of serial killers in the United States
