= John List =

American accountant and family annihilator (1925–2008)

- Mugshot of List, c. 2005
- Born: John Emil List; September 17, 1925; Bay City, Michigan, U.S.
- Died: March 21, 2008 (aged 82); Trenton, New Jersey, U.S.
- Other name: Robert Peter "Bob" Clark
- Education: University of Michigan, Ann Arbor
- Occupation: Accountant
- Spouses: Helen Morris Taylor (m. 1951; died 1971) Delores Miller Clark (m. 1985; div. 1989)
- Children: 3
- Status: Died in prison
- Motive: Financial problems, perceived religious abandonment
- Conviction: First degree murder (5 counts)
- Penalty: 5 consecutive terms of life imprisonment
- Time at large: 17 years, 6 months, 23 days

Details
- Date: November 9, 1971
- Locations: Westfield, New Jersey, U.S.
- Targets: Mother, wife, three children
- Killed: 5
- Weapons: 9mm Steyr handgun; Colt .22-caliber revolver
- Date apprehended: June 1, 1989

John Emil List (September 17, 1925 – March 21, 2008) was an American mass murderer and long-time fugitive. On November 9, 1971, he killed his wife, mother, and three children in their Westfield, New Jersey home, then disappeared. He had planned the murders meticulously; nearly a month passed before his family's bodies were discovered.

List assumed a new identity, remarried, and eluded justice for nearly 18 years. He was finally apprehended in Virginia on June 1, 1989, after the story of his murders was broadcast on the television program America's Most Wanted. After extradition to New Jersey, he was convicted on five counts of first degree murder and sentenced to five consecutive terms of life imprisonment, making him ineligible for parole for nearly 125 years.

List gave critical financial problems, as well as his perception that his family members were straying from their religious faith, as his motivations for the murders. He claimed to believe that killing them would assure their souls a place in heaven.

== Early life and education ==
Born in Bay City, Michigan, List was the only child of German American parents John Frederick List and Alma Marie Barbara Florence List, who were first cousins once removed. Like his father, List was a devout Lutheran and a Sunday school teacher. List graduated from Bay City Central High School in 1943. That same year, he enlisted in the United States Army and served as a laboratory technician during World War II. His father died in 1944. After List was discharged in 1946, he enrolled at the University of Michigan in Ann Arbor, where he earned a bachelor's degree in business administration and a master's degree in accounting, and was commissioned a lieutenant through ROTC.

== Military service and civilian career ==
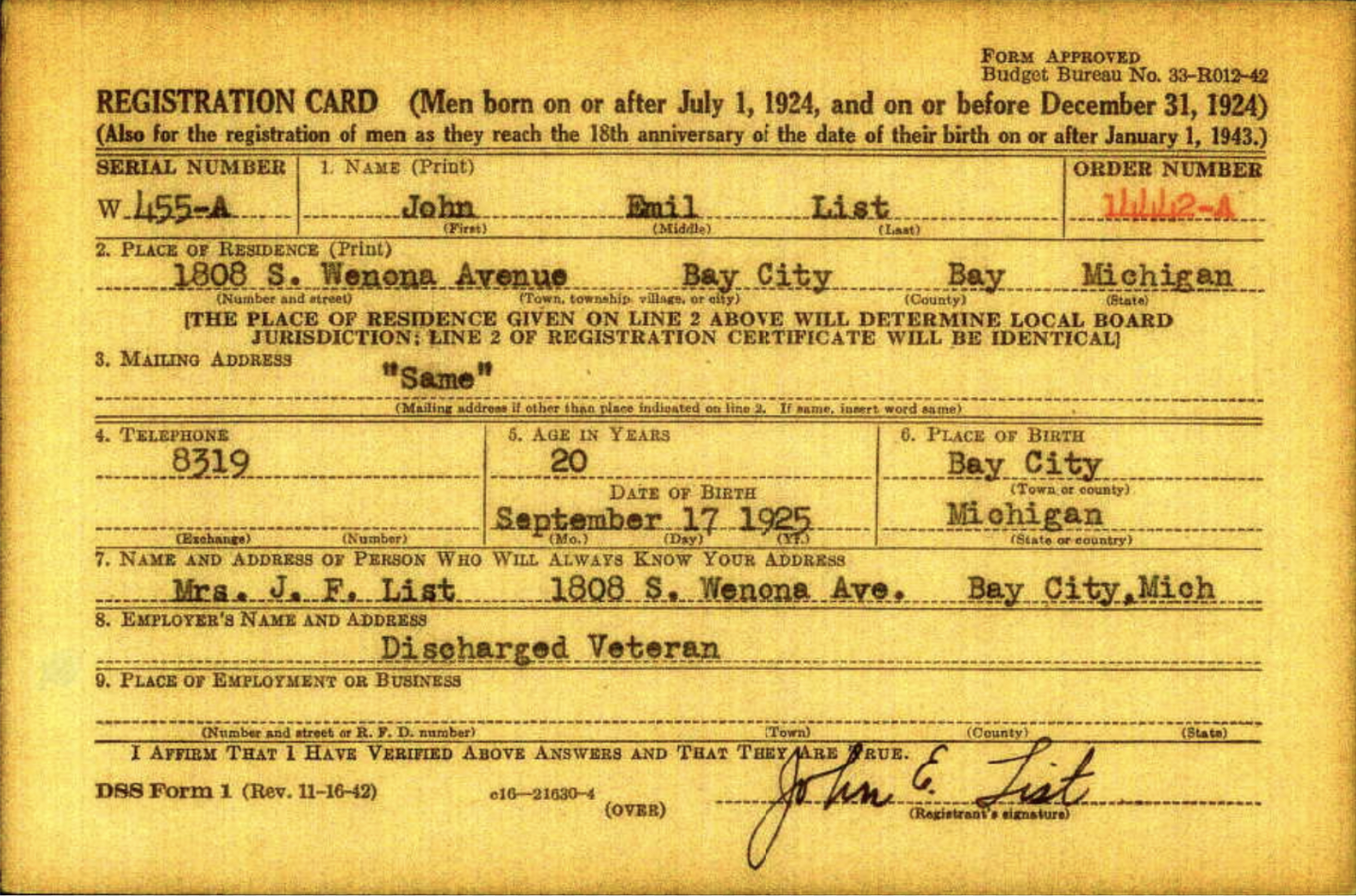
List's draft registration card.

In November 1950, as the Korean War escalated, List was recalled to active military service. At Fort Eustis in Virginia, he met Helen Morris Taylor, the widow of an infantry officer killed in action in Korea, who lived nearby with her daughter, Brenda. John and Helen married on December 1, 1951, in Baltimore, Maryland, and the family moved to Northern California. The Army, recognizing List's accounting skills, reassigned him to the Finance Corps.

After completion of his second tour in 1952, List worked for an accounting firm in Detroit, and then as an audit supervisor at a paper company in Kalamazoo, where his three children were born between 1955 and 1958. By 1959, List had risen to general supervisor of the company's accounting department; but Helen, an alcoholic, had become increasingly unstable due to syphilis she had contracted from her first husband, which she did not disclose to List before their marriage. In 1960, his stepdaughter Brenda married and left the household, and List moved with the remainder of his family to Rochester, New York, to take a job with Xerox. There, he eventually became director of accounting services. In 1965, List accepted a position as vice president and comptroller at a bank in Jersey City, New Jersey, and moved with his wife, children, and mother into Breeze Knoll, a 19-room Victorian mansion, located at 431 Hillside Avenue in Westfield, New Jersey.

== Murders ==
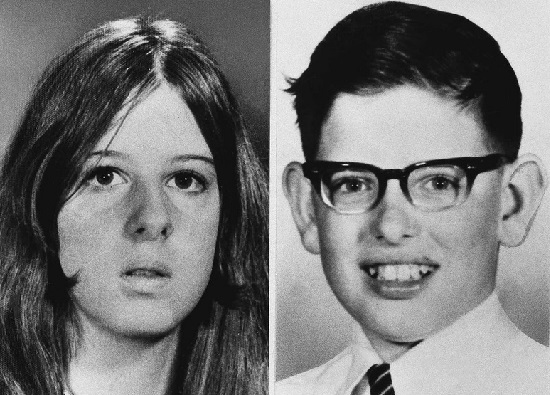
Patricia and John Frederick List

On November 9, 1971, List murdered his mother, wife, and three children, using his 9mm Steyr 1912 semi-automatic handgun and his father's Colt .22 calibre revolver. While his children were at school, he shot his wife, Helen, 47, in the back of the head, then his mother, Alma, 84, above the left eye. As his daughter, Patricia, 16, and younger son, Frederick, 13, arrived home from school, List shot each of them in the back of the head. After making himself lunch, List drove to his bank to close his and his mother's bank accounts, then to Westfield High School to watch his elder son, John Frederick, 15, play in a soccer game. After driving John Frederick home, List shot him repeatedly because, as misfire evidence showed, his son attempted to defend himself.

List placed the bodies of his wife and children on sleeping bags in the mansion's ballroom. He left his mother's body in her apartment in the attic. In a five-page letter to his pastor found on the desk in his study, List claimed that he saw too much evil in the world, and he had killed his mother, wife, and three children to save their souls. He then cleaned the various crime scenes, removed his picture from all family photographs in the house, turned the radio on to a religious station, lowered the temperature to preserve the bodies, and departed.

The murders were not discovered until December 7, nearly a month later, partly because of the family's reclusive tendencies and also due to notes List sent to the children's schools and part-time jobs claiming that the children would be visiting their ailing maternal grandmother in North Carolina for a few weeks. Helen's mother was ill and had cancelled a visit to Westfield because of it; had she made the trip, List later said, she would have been his sixth victim. List also stopped milk, mail, and newspaper deliveries. Neighbors noticed that all of the mansion's rooms were illuminated day and night with no apparent activity within the house. After light bulbs began burning out one by one, they called the police. Officers entered through an unlocked window leading to the basement and discovered the family's bodies.

Westfield, which had few violent crimes recorded since 1963, received national attention as the site of one of the most notorious felonies in New Jersey since the kidnapping and murder of Charles Lindbergh Jr. A nationwide manhunt was launched. Police investigated hundreds of leads without success. All reliable photographs of List had been destroyed. The family car (a green 1963 Chevrolet Impala sedan) was found parked at John F. Kennedy Airport in New York City, but police found no evidence that List had boarded a flight. Alma's body was flown to Frankenmuth, Michigan, and interred at the Saint Lorenz Lutheran Cemetery. Helen and her three children were buried at Fairview Cemetery in Westfield.

Breeze Knoll remained empty until it was destroyed by fire in August 1972, nine months after the murders. Although the destruction was officially ruled arson, it remains unsolved with no suspects. Destroyed along with the home was the ballroom's stained glass skylight, rumored to be a signed Tiffany original, worth at least $100,000 at the time (equivalent to $770,000 in 2025). A new house was built on the site in 1974.

== Relocation, arrest, and trial ==
In 1971, as the FBI later discovered, List had traveled by train from New Jersey first to Michigan, then to Colorado. He settled in Denver in early 1972 and took an accounting job under the name Robert Peter "Bob" Clark, one of List's college classmates (although the real Bob Clark later stated that he had never known List). From 1979 to 1986, he was the comptroller at a paper box manufacturer outside Denver. He joined a Lutheran congregation and ran a car pool for church members without transport. At one religious gathering, he met an Army PX clerk named Delores Miller and they were married in 1985. In February 1988, the couple moved into a house on Sagewood Trace in the Brandermill community of Midlothian, Virginia, where List, still using the name Bob Clark, resumed work as an accountant at a small accounting firm, Maddrea, Joyner, Kirkham & Woody.

In 1972, List was proposed as a suspect in the D. B. Cooper air piracy case because of the timing of his disappearance (two weeks prior to the airline hijacking), multiple matches to the hijacker's description, and the reasoning that "a fugitive accused of mass murder has nothing to lose." List was questioned by FBI investigators after his capture, but he denied any involvement in the Cooper case. While his name is still occasionally mentioned in Cooper articles and documentaries, no direct evidence implicates him, and the FBI no longer considers him a suspect.

In May 1989, after 17 years, 6 months, and 23 days, the crime was recounted on the Fox television program America's Most Wanted during its first year on the air. The segment featured an age-progressed clay bust, sculpted by forensic artist Frank Bender, which turned out to bear a close resemblance to List's actual appearance. On June 1, less than two weeks after the broadcast, List was arrested at his workplace, Maddrea, Joyner, Kirkham & Woody, a Richmond accounting firm, after a former Denver neighbor recognized the description and alerted authorities. List continued to stand by his alias for several months, even after his 1989 extradition to Union County, New Jersey; finally, faced with irrefutable evidence – including a fingerprint match with List's military records, as well as evidence found at the crime scene – he confessed his true identity on February 16, 1990.

At trial, List testified that his financial difficulties reached crisis level in 1971 when he was laid off with the closure of the Jersey City bank. To avoid sharing this development with his family, List engaged in the same routine and dress as when employed, leaving home each morning on schedule and spending the day at job interviews or at the Westfield train station, reading newspapers until it was time to come home. List diverted money from his mother's bank accounts to avoid default on his mortgage. As the family's finances became more strained, List encouraged his children to seek part-time work, ostensibly to teach them maturity and responsibility, but in actuality to help keep the family financially solvent.

He was also dealing with his wife's alcoholism and her untreated tertiary syphilis, contracted from her first husband and concealed for 18 years. According to trial testimony, Helen had pressured List into marriage by falsely claiming that she was pregnant, then insisted that they marry in Maryland, which did not require the premarital syphilis test mandated in most other states at the time. Though her health progressively deteriorated, she said nothing to List or her physicians until 1969, when a thorough examination revealed the condition. By then, progression of the disease combined with her excessive alcohol consumption had, according to testimony, "transformed her [into]... an unkempt and paranoid recluse" who frequently – and often publicly – humiliated List, comparing his sexual prowess unfavorably with that of her first husband.

A court-appointed psychiatrist testified that List suffered from obsessive–compulsive personality disorder and that he saw only two solutions to his situation: accept welfare, or kill his family and send their souls to heaven. Welfare was an unacceptable option, he reasoned, because it would expose him and his family to ridicule and violate his authoritarian father's teachings regarding the care and protection of family members.

On April 12, 1990, List was convicted of five counts of first degree murder. At his sentencing hearing, he denied direct responsibility for his actions: "I feel that because of my mental state at the time, I was unaccountable for what happened. I ask all affected by this for their forgiveness, understanding and prayer." The judge was unpersuaded: "John Emil List is without remorse and without honor," he said. "After 18 years, five months and 22 days, it is now time for the voices of Helen, Alma, Patricia, Frederick and John F. List to rise from the grave." He imposed a sentence of five terms of life imprisonment, to be served consecutively, the maximum permissible penalty at the time.

List filed an appeal of his convictions on grounds that his judgment had been impaired by post-traumatic stress disorder due to his military service. He also argued that the letter he left behind at the crime scene, essentially his confession, was a confidential communication to his pastor and therefore inadmissible as evidence. A federal appeals court rejected both arguments. List eventually expressed a degree of remorse for his crimes. In 2002, he told Connie Chung, "I wish I had never done what I did", and added, "I've regretted my action and prayed for forgiveness ever since." When asked why he had not taken his own life if he felt so overwhelmed, he said he believed that suicide would have prevented him from going to heaven, where he hoped to be reunited with his family.

== Death ==
List died of complications from pneumonia aged 82 on March 21, 2008, while imprisoned at St. Francis Medical Center in Trenton, New Jersey. In reporting his death, the New Jersey Star-Ledger referred to him as "The Boogeyman of Westfield".

== Television, film, and pop culture ==
Over the years, List and his crimes have furnished inspiration for documentaries, television dramas and feature films. Examples include "Savior", season 6, episode 16 of the television series Law & Order; "Family Values", season 8 episode 9 of Law & Order: Criminal Intent; the 1987 film The Stepfather and its 2009 remake; the 1993 film Judgment Day: The John List Story, in which List was portrayed by Robert Blake; and the character Keyser Söze in the 1995 film The Usual Suspects.

A 1996 episode of the series Forensic Files discussed the List murders. A 2003 episode of the A&E series American Justice also detailed the case and featured an interview with List. In 2008, John Walsh, the host of America's Most Wanted, donated the age-progressed bust by Frank Bender that played a pivotal role in List's apprehension to a forensic science exhibition at the National Museum of Crime & Punishment in Washington, D.C., whose collection was later moved to Alcatraz East Crime Museum in Pigeon Forge, Tennessee. In 2015, the story was covered in the season 2, episode 2 of the Investigation Discovery TV series Your Worst Nightmare. The episode, "Murder House", premiered on November 18, 2015. The movie A Killer Next Door, based on the events that led to the capture of John List, was released in July 2020.

In 2022, NJ Advance Media released Father Wants Us Dead, a podcast serial on the events. Also in 2022, Netflix released a seven-part dramatic fictional miniseries called The Watcher. Although it is a work of fiction based on a real article, much of the character John Graff was borrowed from the story of the John List murders. The character of John Graff, played by Joe Mantello, was identical to John List in several ways, such as his being an accountant, attending a Lutheran church, and murdering his family members and live-in mother, along with leaving music playing in the house and planning an alibi that would cause the bodies to remain undiscovered for several weeks.

== See also ==
- Dupont de Ligonnès murders and disappearance
- Robert William Fisher
- Bradford Bishop
- Watts family murders
- Williams family murders
