= List of City Confidential episodes =

City Confidential is a documentary television series where a different city is featured in a high-profile criminal case. The shows were narrated by Paul Winfield and then Keith David. A total of 11 seasons have been broadcast from 1998 to 2005 on the A&E Network. The episode numbering is as provided by A&E's official website's episode guide.

== Season 1 ==
No. overall	No. in season	Title	Location	Original release date
1	1	"Deadly Odds in Biloxi"	Biloxi, Mississippi	November 22, 1999
Judge Vincent Sherry and his wife Margaret are gunned down in their home.
2	2	"The Chicago Horse Mafia"	Chicago, Illinois	April 28, 2001
The murder of candy heiress Helen Vorhees Brach and its connection to the champion racehorse murders.
3	3	"Faith and Foul Play in Salt Lake City"	Salt Lake City, Utah	December 4, 2000
On a single day in 1985, two separate car bombs kill Mac Christensen and Kathy Sheets. A third victim, Mark Hofmann, is only injured. Hofmann, a respected Mormon, becomes a suspect.
4	4	"Sunny Days, Deadly Nights on Mercer Island"	Mercer Island, Washington	August 3, 1999
A woman's body is found outside of a Seattle night club. The suspect is an affluent and charismatic man named George Russell.
5	5	"Secrets and Superstition in Salem"	Salem, Massachusetts	October 28, 2000
A lobsterman discovers a body part in one of his traps. It belongs to Martha Brailsford, who had been missing for six days.
6	6	"Midnight in Miami"	Miami, Florida	September 28, 1999
Stan Cohen, a multi-millionaire living in Coconut Grove, is murdered using his own gun. His socialite wife Joyce is suspected of hiring hit men.
7	7	"New Orleans: Betrayal in the Big Easy"	New Orleans, Louisiana	August 10, 1999
The murder investigation of Kim Marie Groves unravels corruption in the New Orleans Police Department.
8	8	"Nashville: Murder in Music City"	Nashville, Tennessee	September 14, 1999
Hee Haw actor David "Stringbean" Akeman and his wife are found shot to death in their home.
9	9	"Little Rock: The Politics of Murder"	Little Rock, Arkansas	January 1, 1999
Alice McArthur, the wife of an affluent criminal defense attorney, is murdered. Her husband's client is revealed to be his mistress and a suspect.
10	10	"Las Vegas: Deadly Jackpot"	Las Vegas, Nevada	October 5, 1999
After Larry Volk admits to authorities that his software for American Coin poker machines is rigged, he is murdered.
11	11	"Dallas: Arsenic and Old Money"	Dallas, Texas	June 23, 2002
Nancy Lyon dies from arsenic poisoning in the wealthy Dallas suburb of Park Cities. Her husband is a suspect.
12	12	"Ft. Lauderdale: Sin in the Sun"	Ft. Lauderdale, Florida	February 13, 2001
Jeffrey and Kathy Willet operate a bordello in their home. However, one of their clients turns out to be a politician who has been campaigning against porn.

== Season 2 ==
No. overall	No. in season	Title	Location	Original release date
13	1	"Missing in Paradise"	Hermosa Beach, California	October 26, 1999
Linda Sobek, a body model, is murdered; her photographer becomes a suspect.
14	2	"Death on the Rock"	Bermuda	January 1, 2006
The case of Rebecca Jane Middleton shakes up relations between Canada and Bermuda.
15	3	"The Last Side Show"	Gibsonton, Florida	August 17, 1999
The investigation of the murder of Grady Stiles, who went by the name "Lobster Boy", leads to a town for a variety of circus folks.
16	4	"Betrayal by the Bay"	San Francisco, California	August 11, 1999
Murder is the result when O'Farrell Theatre co-owners and brothers, Jim and Artie Mitchell, quarrel.
17	5	"The Art of Murder"	SoHo, New York City	October 13, 1999
After Cuban artist, Ana Mendieta, falls to her death, her husband, Carl Andre, becomes a suspect.
18	6	"Showdown at the Mustang Ranch"	Virginia City, Nevada	March 14, 2000
Joe Conforte, the owner of the Mustang Ranch brothel, becomes embroiled in scandal.
19	7	"Fairbanks"	Fairbanks, Alaska	September 22, 1999
The death of Joseph E. Vogler, the founder of the Alaskan Independence Party, brings a growing list of suspects.
20	8	"Who Killed Martha Moxley?"	Greenwich, Connecticut	October 20, 1999
The murder of Martha Moxley reveals another scandal for the Kennedy family.
21	9	"Pistols, Ponies, and Foul Play"	Middleburg, Virginia	January 4, 2000
After Roberto Villegas is shot and killed by heiress Susan Cummings, investigators must determine if it is self-defense or cold blooded murder.
22	10	"Frontier Justice"	Skidmore, Missouri	November 17, 1999
Vigilante farmers kill Ken McElroy, a criminal who terrorized Skidmore, Missouri.
23	11	"Foul Play in the Bible Belt"	Scottsboro, Alabama	February 22, 2000
Glen Dale Summerford, a pastor of a snake-handler church, is suspected of attempting to kill his wife Darlene by sticking her hand in a cage full of rattlesnakes.
24	12	"Small Town Justice"	Newberry, South Carolina	July 17, 2000
The body of Victoria Lander Beckam, daughter of state senator James Lander, is found. The prime suspect is her husband, the son of a bishop.

== Season 3 ==
No. overall	No. in season	Title	Location	Original release date
26	1	"Dangerous Affairs"	Wilmington, Delaware	September 8, 1999
When Anne Marie Fahey disappears, a former deputy Attorney General, Thomas Capano, becomes the prime suspect.
28	2	"The Mayor and the Mob"	Atlantic City, New Jersey	March 14, 2000
The investigation into the activities of Atlantic City Mayor Michael J. Matthews reveals ties to mob boss Nicodemo Scarfo.
29	3	"Dirty Deals, Buried Secrets"	Ingleside, Texas	April 11, 2000
Ingleside Mayor Mark Crawford murders business partner Nick Brueggen, but authorities have difficulty in convicting him.
30	4	"Pirates in Paradise"	Key West, Florida	April 25, 2000
Mel Fisher was a chicken farmer who became a world-renowned treasure hunter from scavenging shipwrecks. However, when he is later accused of selling counterfeit coins, he mysteriously dies from cancer.
31	5	"The Socialite and the Politician"	St. Augustine, Florida	May 9, 2000
The unsolved case of model and mayor's wife Athalia Ponsell Lindsley, who was hacked to death.
32	6	"Danger in the Desert"	Carlsbad, New Mexico	June 12, 2000
The acquittal of politician John S. Volpato leaves his wife Elaine's murder case without any more suspects.
33	7	"Shady Deals in Sun City"	Phoenix, Arizona	June 20, 2000
Pat Redmond, his wife Marilyn, and Marilyn's mother, Helen Phelps are shot in their home by three men. Marilyn, who survives the attack, identifies one of the men as Pat's business partner, who is then suspected of having ties to the mob and hiring the hit men.
34	8	"The Devil and the Delta Blues"	Greenwood, Mississippi	August 21, 2000
The untimely death of famed blues guitarist Robert Johnson in 1938 sparks a variety of theories on what happened that fateful night.
35	9	"The Criminal Next Door"	Great Falls, Virginia	July 11, 2000
Renowned cardiologist Michael J. Halberstam is shot during a burglary by Bernard C. Welch. Halberstam hits Welch with his car as he drives to the hospital.
36	10	"Double Dutch Bust"	Philadelphia, Pennsylvania	August 5, 2000
The investigation of a highly respected dentist, Larry Lavin, reveals a secret life of drug dealing.
37	11	"Deadly Draw in the Wild West"	Rock Springs, Wyoming	September 26, 2000
Ed Cantrell, the town's public safety director, shoots his own drug agent, Michael Rosa. The court hears two radically different accounts of what happened.
38	12	"Smoky Mountain Nightmare"	Gatlinburg, Tennessee	September 12, 2000
The brutal murders of Melissa Hill and Troy Valentine by a group led by Edward Leroy Harris, known as "Tattoo Eddie", and his girlfriend, Kimberly Kay Pelley.
39	13	"Betrayal in Beantown"	Boston, Massachusetts	December 19, 2000
Racial tensions are fueled when Charles Stuart reports that he and his wife Carol have been shot in their car by a black gunman. However, it is revealed that he made up the story to murder Carol and to claim her life insurance.

== Season 4 ==
No. overall	No. in season	Title	Location	Original release date
40	1	"Silent Night, Deadly Night"	Bigfork, Montana	January 17, 2001
In the Larry Streeter murder case, the suspect is a 19-year-old paraplegic wheelchair racing champion, Ted Ernst.
41	2	"Tragedy in the Heartland"	Ruthton, Minnesota	September 12, 2000
Lured to a deserted farm, bankers Rudolph Blythe Jr. and Deems "Toby" Thulin are shot and killed.
42	3	"Clash with the Klan"	Greensboro, North Carolina	February 27, 2001
Klansmen murder local communists in what becomes known as "The Greensboro Massacre".
43	4	"Empty Graves"	Austin, Texas	March 27, 2001
American Atheists founder Madalyn Murray O'Hair, her son Jon, and granddaughter Robin disappear. An investigation ensues.
44	5	"Betrayal on the Big Island"	Hilo, Hawaii	September 5, 2001
Yvonne Mathison's husband, a sergeant in the local police department, says he accidentally ran her over with his van. The evidence says otherwise.
45	6	"Showdown in the High Desert"	Paradise Valley, Nevada	April 24, 2001
Idaho Department of Fish and Game officers, Conley Elms and Bill Pogue, are shot and killed by mountain man and wildlife poacher Claude Lafayette Dallas, Jr.
46	7	"Brother Against Brother"	Akron, Ohio	February 6, 2001
Authorities determine that the murder of cosmetic king, Constantine Dean Milo, was arranged by the victim's own brother.
47	8	"Bad News in Battle Creek"	Battle Creek, Michigan	May 2, 2001
WUHQ's morning news anchor, Diane King, is found dead in her driveway. An investigation is conducted on her spouse, who is a former cop and a professor of criminal justice at Western Michigan University.
48	9	"Dangerous Trespassing"	Chattanooga, Tennessee	August 1, 2001
When Kenneth Griffith, Richard Mason and Earl Smock are gunned down in the Signal Mountain murders, mountain man Frank Casteel becomes the prime suspect.
49	10	"Fallen Rose"	Tyler, Texas	June 6, 2001
Baker Steven Lucas, the son of a former mayor, bludgeons his mother, Bette, to death.
50	11	"Foul Play on the Friendly Island"	Lopez Island, Washington	May 23, 2001
A former ship captain, 83-year-old Rolf Neslund, is shot, cut up and burned. The investigation reveals that he had an argument, with his wife Ruth, over his retirement fund. Rolf's body is never found and the case goes unsolved for several years until there is enough evidence to charge his wife, Ruth for his murder. She is later convicted and sentenced to life in prison.
51	12	"Terror in Titletown"	Green Bay, Wisconsin	September 26, 2001
Sandra Maloney is strangled and set on fire. The police suspect her husband who is a veteran investigator in the department's arson division.
52	13	"Murder on the Slopes"	Aspen, Colorado	June 27, 2001
Claudine Georgette Longet, ex-wife of singer Andy Williams, is accused of murdering her lover, downhill ski champion Vladimir Sabich.

== Season 5 ==
No. overall	No. in season	Title	Location	Original release date
53	1	"Scandal on the Bayou"	Baton Rouge, Louisiana	July 11, 2001
When Sylvia Landry, the owner of a high-profile escort service, is convicted on prostitution charges, concerns arise that she my reveal her client list. She is later found dead in her jail cell.
54	2	"The Murder of Good Time Charlie"	Malibu, California	August 29, 2001
After Charlie Minor, a record promoter for musicians such as Sting and Janet Jackson, sidelines stripper Suzette McClure for a new lover, he is found with nine bullet holes in his body.
55	3	"A Woman Scorned"	Santa Monica, California	July 25, 2001
When the extra-marital affair between Linda C. Brown and Kevin Cummings, both of the Santa Monica Police Department, goes sour, one of them uses a gun to make a point.
58	4	"Showdown at the Station"	Athens, Georgia	August 15, 2001
Local business rivals T.K. Harty and John Henry Mooney elevate their feud to murder for hire.
59	5	"Murder in a College Town"	Berkeley, California	January 2, 2002
A cantankerous city commissioner, Enrique Zambrano, is the primary suspect in the 1988 beating of married couple Robert and Barbara Mishell. The star witness in the case, Luis Reyna, is found decapitated.
60	6	"Deadly Medicine"	Ozark, Arkansas	December 26, 2001
Rebecca Johnson, one of the state's wealthiest doctors, is conned out of over a million dollars before losing her life.
61	7	"A Co-ed’s Secret"	Detroit, Michigan	November 7, 2001
Tina Biggar, a Catholic graduate student, leads a double life as a prostitute. After her boyfriend finds that she has gone missing, the investigation leads to drifter Ken Trachinda.
62	8	"Deadly Games in Little Washington"	Washington, North Carolina	October 3, 2001
Christopher W. Pritchard is a guy who is obsessed with Dungeons & Dragons that he and his friends often role-play by trekking through their college campus steam tunnels and carrying real weapons. He is suspected of killing his step-father, Lieth Von Stein.
63	9	"Mob Hits and Misses"	Youngstown, Ohio	October 17, 2001
On Christmas Eve 1996, Mahoning County Prosecutor, Paul Gains, is shot and left for dead. The botched hit leads to the downfall of Lenine "Lenny" Strollo, mob boss for the Pittsburgh crime family.
64	10	"The Final Curtain"	Kansas City, Missouri	December 12, 2001
Steven L. Harvey, an upcoming local jazz musician, is murdered, but the suspect is acquitted. Harvey's friends and family fight to bring his killers to justice.
65	11	"Campaign for Cover-Up"	Denver, Colorado	November 28, 2001
After authorities declare the death of Lawrence Ocrant a suicide, his children find a way to prove that the case was botched and that it was, in fact, murder.
66	12	"Cruel Summer"	Paducah, Kentucky	January 16, 2002
Bobbi Holman Williams, the owner of a local upscale restaurant, is killed. Her husband becomes a suspect.
67	13	"Bad Medicine in Bangor"	Bangor, Maine	January 30, 2002
Prominent pediatric neurologist Dr. John Malmstrom is murdered. His wife is put on trial.
68	14	"Huntsville: Twins on Trial"	Huntsville, Alabama	January 30, 2002
Despite Huntsville's reputation among Southerners as a Yankee city, the town is shocked when a troubled Vietnam veteran accuses two sisters of hiring him to kill one of the women's husbands.

== Season 6 ==
No. overall	No. in season	Title	Location	Original release date
69	1	"The Legend of Bambi Bembenek"	Milwaukee, Wisconsin	March 27, 2002
Former cop and Playboy bunny Laurie Bembenek is charged with murdering Christine Schultz, her husband's ex-wife. Her escape and later capture in Canada inspired a catchphrase "Run, Bambi, Run!"
70	2	"The Black Widow"	Albuquerque, New Mexico	March 6, 2002
Womanizer Eugene Gilbert is gunned down in his basement by his wife, Terri, who thought he was an intruder.
71	3	"Devil Down in Georgia"	Atlanta, Georgia	May 19, 2002
After Sara Ambrusko Tokars is murdered, the investigation reveals knowledge of shady dealings by her husband, who is a lawyer and former prosecutor.
72	4	"High Times and Hate Crimes"	Park City, Utah	April 21, 2002
Doug Koehler, a homosexual, is murdered after he used cocaine and made unwanted advances to another man. However, the judge sentences his killer to only six years.
73	5	"Cheers and Fears"	Houston, Texas	July 14, 2002
To get her daughter on the high school cheerleading squad, Wanda Holloway, arranges to hire a hitman to kill the mother of her daughter's rival.
74	6	"Brothers in Arms"	Beverly Hills, California	November 10, 2002
Erik and Lyle Menéndez, the only two sons of a wealthy record executive, brutally execute their parents, José and Kitty. During their trial, they claimed self-defense and a history of abuse.
75	7	"The Heiress and Her Lover"	Lynchburg, Virginia	December 15, 2002
The investigation into the murder of a South African steel magnate, Derek W.R. Haysom, and his wife, Nancy Astor Benedict Haysom, (a relative of the renowned Lady Astor) leads to their daughter, Elizabeth Haysom.
76	8	"Horror in Amityville"	Amityville, New York	June 9, 2002
The well-known Amityville Horror house and its history is examined.
77	9	"Faith and Felonies"	Orlando, Florida	October 20, 2002
Conservative televangelist George Crossley is upset that Disney expanded insurance benefits to same-sex partners of employees. However, he has his own problems when he is arrested and charged with conspiring to murder his lover's husband, Butch Waldo.
78	10	"Burning Betrayal"	Memphis, Tennessee	September 15, 2002
FedEx airline pilot Mike Mullins is accused of killing his wife Holly, who is also a FedEx pilot. It is revealed they were planning a divorce.
79	11	"Maximum Justice"	San Antonio, Texas	August 4, 2002
Judge John H. Wood, Jr. is shot and killed outside his apartment. The hit man charged is Charles Harrelson, the father of actor Woody Harrelson.
80	12	"Fatal Inheritance"	Fresno, California	January 1, 2003
Dana Ewell murders his father, Dale, his mother, Glee, and his sister, Tiffany, so he can inherit his family's fortune.

== Season 7 ==
No. overall	No. in season	Title	Location	Original release date
81	1	"Dangerous Housewife"	Durham, North Carolina	January 15, 2003
Barbara Stager shoots and kills her husband Russell, a high school teacher and baseball coach. She claims it was an accident, but her history reveals that her first husband also died of an accidental gunshot wound.
82	2	"Under Suspicion"	Archer City, Texas	December 1, 2003
In the hometown of novelist Larry McMurtry, Gail Bennett is accused of shooting her third ex-husband. However, she accuses the county sheriff, Presley Lamar "P.L." Pippin, of raping her.
83	3	"Outlaw Attorney"	El Paso, Texas	June 18, 2003
The investigation of the murder of Lee Chagra, a well-liked defense attorney for drug dealers and smugglers.
84	4	"Smugglers & Speedboats"	Miami Beach, Florida	March 5, 2003
Speedboat builder Don Aronow is murdered in his Mercedes coupe. The investigation raises several people of interest from drug smugglers and mistresses to rival speedboat companies.
85	5	"Unfriendly Fire"	Portland, Maine	March 19, 2003
Sabato "Sabino" Raia, a tavern owner, shoots three men who had assaulted him at work and followed him home. He claims it was in self-defense, but the community is surprised when he is charged with murder.
86	6	"Silenced Partner"	Los Angeles, California	April 2, 2003
Horace McKenna and Michael Woods were former cops that successfully got into the strip club business. When McKenna is murdered, detectives discover that the events resemble the stories from the film, The Takeover, which was produced by the suspects. The film even mentions the same clubs with which McKenna and Woods had partnered.
87	7	"Badge of Dishonor"	San Diego, California	May 7, 2003
College student Cara Knott is killed at a highway overpass. The investigation leads to Craig Peyer, a by-the-book and exemplary CHP officer.
88	8	"Til Death Do Us Part"	Pittsburgh, Pennsylvania	June 4, 2003
Maryann Boczkowski drowns in her outdoor hot tub. Detectives discover that oddly enough, her husband's first wife, Mary Elaine, also "accidentally" drowned in a tub.
89	9	"Panther on the Run"	Charlotte, North Carolina	May 21, 2003
Carolina Panthers player Rae Carruth conspires to kill his pregnant girlfriend, Cherica Adams.
90	10	"Predator in the Parks"	Spokane, Washington	February 5, 2003
The case of Frederick "Kevin" Coe, known as the South Hill Rapist, is detailed. He is suspected of over 53 assaults between 1978 and 1981.
91	11	"Deadly Infestation"	Palm Beach, Florida	November 3, 2003
Restaurant owner Geraldine Pucillo is strangled; the suspect is Kim Cain, a pest control worker.
92	12	"Tragedy 101"	Hanover, New Hampshire	July 14, 2003
The story of the 2001 Dartmouth College murders, in which a professor couple, Half and Susanne Zantop are killed.

== Season 8 ==
No. overall	No. in season	Title	Location	Original release date
93	1	"The Doctor's Double"	Wellesley, Massachusetts	August 11, 2003
Dirk Greineder, a renowned doctor in the community, is charged with murdering his wife May. The investigation reveals that he was living a double life.
94	2	"Spoonful of Arsenic"	Macon, Georgia	July 21, 2003
Successful restaurant owner Anjette Lyles is charged with poisoning two husbands, her mother-in-law and her daughter. The community raises possibilities of voodoo influences.
95	3	"Social Insecurity"	Sebring, Florida	September 22, 2003
Elderly newlyweds Leo Gleese and Hazel Stanley Gleese are murdered. Their pastor, John Canning, is arrested.
96	4	"In Harm's Way"	Santa Fe, New Mexico	July 7, 2003
Pharmacist Chester Radecki is shot when he was trying to help a woman from being raped by a motorist. Investigators suspect Daniel J. Martinez is the assailant but the bystanding police officer confuses the situation.
97	5	"Fashion Victim"	South Beach, Florida	October 6, 2003
Celebrity fashion designer Gianni Versace, is shot and killed on the beach just outside his home. The suspect is serial killer Andrew Cunanan.
98	6	"Eliminating the Competition"	Potomac, Maryland	February 8, 2004
Former U.S. Senate candidate Ruthann Aron is charged with trying to get her husband and lawyer killed.
99	7	"Family Man, Hit Man"	St. Louis, Missouri	January 17, 2004
While Richard DeCaro takes his kids to a "daddy's weekend", wife Elizabeth is killed. Richard is suspected of hiring a hit man.
100	8	"Crimes of Passion"	Elkhart, Indiana	August 4, 2003
Gary Knepp's mistress is charged for conspiring to murder Gary's wife Carol.
101	9	"Chaos in the Castle"	Newport, Rhode Island	November 24, 2003
Elderly widow Ruth Tinney adopts her 38-year-old handyman, Kevin Jacob Koellisch. But when she dies, Kevin makes a bid for her estate.
102	10	"Black Magic"	Brownsville, Texas	August 25, 2003
After high school student Joey Fischer breaks up with his girlfriend, the mother of the girl wants revenge.
103	11	"Sins of the Rabbi"	Cherry Hill, New Jersey	August 15, 2003
Rabbi Fred Neulander is suspected of murdering his wife Carol.
104	12	"Frozen Assets"	Carthage, Texas	October 13, 2003
After 81-year-old Marjorie Nugent went missing for nine months, police finally begin to investigate, and discover her body in the freezer of her business manager Bernie Tiede.

== Season 9 ==
No. overall	No. in season	Title	Location	Original release date
105	1	"A Killer Campaign"	Somerset, Kentucky	September 18, 2004
The murder of Sam Catron, a Pulaski County sheriff, is examined.
106	2	"Last Dance"	Boise, Idaho	June 26, 2004
A Russian ballet dancer becomes the prime suspect in the murder investigation of Wanda Cowger Kuzmichev.
107	3	"Autopsy of a Marriage"	Panama City, Florida	June 12, 2004
Bill Sybers, a respected community doctor, is charged with killing his wife Kay. Although Bill was convicted, he would later have it overturned, and arranged to plead guilty to manslaughter in exchange for time served. (This case was also discussed in the Jodi Picoult novel House Rules.)
108	4	"Skinhead Slayer"	Portland, Oregon	February 21, 2004
White supremacist skinheads beat an Ethiopian student, Mulugeta Seraw, to death.
109	5	"Highway to Hell"	Honesdale, Pennsylvania	March 13, 2004
A homecoming queen is killed in a car accident where her boyfriend, Glenn Evans, was driving under the influence. However, Evans is then murdered by the girl's brother. Note: This is the final episode to feature narrator Paul Winfield, who died March 7, 2004.
110	6	"Death and Taxes"	Milford, Utah	June 19, 2004
When the county authorities seize a Mormon ranch for not paying back taxes and evicts its residents, handyman Tony Hamilton confronts the lawmen, and is charged with the murder of the sheriff's deputy. Note: With this episode, Keith David assumes the role of narrator for City Confidential.
111	7	"A Parting Shot"	Lexington, Kentucky	August 14, 2004
Trent DiGiuro, a football player at University of Kentucky is killed by a sniper with a rifle. Shane Ragland, a fellow player, is charged for the murder.
112	8	"Terror in the Suburbs"	Barrington, Rhode Island	January 24, 2004
Ernest Brendel, his wife and daughter, mysteriously disappear. Their bodies are later found in a shallow grave after a rain storm.
113	9	"Bad Judgment"	Darlington, Wisconsin	July 31, 2004
After losing a bitter campaign Judge Daniel McDonald offs his rival's law partner, James Klein.
114	10	"Blown Away"	Duchesne, Utah	July 17, 2004
The bizarre John Pinder is accused of the gruesome murders of his ranch hands Rex Tanner and June Flood.

== Season 10 ==
No. overall	No. in season	Title	Location	Original release date
115	1	"Flesh and Blood"	Palo Alto, California	October 16, 2004
Music teacher Kristine Fitzhugh was murdered by her husband, who tried to pass it off as an accident. During the trial, it is revealed that Kristine had a dark secret about her past.
116	2	"Long Walk Home"	Seattle, Washington	December 18, 2004
The 10-year-old cold case of musician Mia Zapata is solved.
117	3	"Deadly Politics"	Cookeville, Tennessee	March 1, 2006
Tommy Burks, a state senate candidate, is shot and killed a few weeks before the election. The prime suspect is his political opponent, Byron (Low Tax) Looper.
118	4	"A Family Affair"	Orange County, California	November 13, 2004
Computer whiz David Brown's fifth wife, 17-year-old Linda, is murdered. David, his 14-year-old daughter Cinnamon, and Linda's younger sister Patti Bailey become suspects. It takes five years before the mastermind is convicted.
119	5	"Frontier Faceoff"	Riggins, Idaho	March 5, 2005
Rob Nuckols, the owner of a militia-style compound, is charged with dealing drugs. Nuckols claims the government made up the charges to seize his land.
120	6	"Kentucky Gothic"	Pikeville, Kentucky	March 26, 2005
Vidar Lillelid and his family are murdered by a group of teenagers.
121	7	"The Mayor and the Mob"	Providence, Rhode Island	November 20, 2004
Mayor Buddy Cianci is arrested and indicted on various charges as part of "Operation Plunder Dome".
122	8	"Phantom Hitman"	Knoxville, Tennessee	December 11, 2004
The botched murder of Rob Whedbee becomes a media circus.
123	9	"Thou Shalt Not Kill"	Emporia, Kansas	January 29, 2005
A minister and his mistress murder their spouses, Martin Moore and Linda Bird.
124	10	"Fatal Friendship"	Conway, South Carolina	November 6, 2004
Crystal Todd is raped and murdered by her best friend, a former high-school football player.

== Season 11 ==
No. overall	No. in season	Title	Location	Original release date
125	1	"The Big Heist"	Rochester, New York	April 24, 2005
The investigation of the fifth largest armored car robbery in U.S. history reveals a diverse group of suspects: a priest, a former cop and a former IRA terrorist.
126	2	"Recipe for Murder"	Merion, Pennsylvania	May 21, 2005
Jim Webb, an owner and chef for the historic General Wayne Inn, is murdered. His fellow chef, Guy Sileo, becomes the prime suspect.
127	3	"Killing Cousins"	West Columbia, Texas	June 18, 2005
When Holmes Weems is murdered; his family members become suspects.
128	4	"High School Hit & Run"	Amarillo, Texas	July 9, 2005
Punk-rock teenager Brian Deneke is murdered by a high school jock during a confrontation in an IHOP parking lot.
129	5	"Deadly Investment"	Minneapolis, Minnesota	July 23, 2005
Michael Prozumenshikov, a Russian immigrant stockholder, is found under a compost heap. Investigators suspect he had been involved in some shady deals.
130	6	"Fatal Blow"	Reading, Massachusetts	August 6, 2005
Thomas Junta is accused of killing Michael Costin after they argued over how rough their kids should play in a pick-up hockey game.
131	7	"The Casino Bomber"	Stateline, Nevada	October 1, 2005
Millionaire John Birges is charged with bombing the Harvey's Casino.
132	8	"From Russia with Murder"	Saddle River, New Jersey	October 15, 2005
The murder of scientist Yakov Gluzman sparks the prosecution to file charges against his wife for interstate domestic violence.
133	9	"The Sausage King"	San Leandro, California	November 5, 2005
Former mayoral candidate Stuart Alexander, known as "The Sausage King", is charged with killing three meat inspectors.
134	10	"Death of a Don"	Elizabeth, New Jersey	December 10, 2005
Three leaders of the DeCavalcante crime family are arrested for killing their boss, Johnny Boy D'Amato. During the trial, it is revealed that the killing was done because of his sexual preference.

== Season 12 ==
No. overall	No. in season	Title	Location	Original release date
135	1	"Monsters on Main Street"	Oil City, Pennsylvania	October 28, 2021
Oil City, PA is a small town with a big history. Once a crucial center for America's steel and petroleum industry, it is now a shadow of its former self. While life for the 10,000 residents can be tough, it is a simple place where bad things rarely happen and people watch out for one another. In 1992, when an 11-year-old Shauna Howe goes missing on her way home from a Halloween party. When it becomes clear a terrible crime has been committed, suddenly the trusting town realizes that monsters exist. For years, police search for clues to try to unmask the evil they are certain lives among them to bring justice to the victim and closure for her family.
136	2	"Murder in Amish Country"	Apple Creek, Ohio	November 4, 2021
Just 30 miles outside of Akron, Ohio, sits an Amish Country village that is a throwback to another time. Over the past two centuries, not much has changed. Modern conveniences such as appliances, cell phones, cars and computers are forbidden. They are devoted to God, family and one another. So when a young mother of five is found shot to death in her home, people are shocked. An investigation is launched, and soon, a community that has worked to avoid prying outsiders finds itself at the center of a murder case—only the second in its 250-year history.
137	3	"Bloodshed in Brookland"	Washington D.C.	November 11, 2021
Three employees are gunned down inside one of Washington D.C.'s favorite brunch spots. Residents are gripped with fear as detectives hunt for the shooter, only to find a group of greedy assassins with a personal vendetta.
138	4	"Violence in the Village"	Houston, Texas	November 18, 2021
Terror sweeps through an upscale shopping district when a shooter attacks women without warning. A lucky break leads police to a ruthless killer who will stop at nothing to unleash a deep-seated hatred.
139	5	"Death Dorm"	Washington D.C.	December 2, 2021
Students fear for their lives in the fall of 2000 when Gallaudet University, a college for the deaf, becomes a killer's hunting ground. Detectives sift through the twisted mystery and learn not everyone on campus is who they seem to be.
140	6	"The Last Call Killer"	New York City	December 9, 2021
New York City, known for its diversity and acceptance, becomes the focus for a sadistic serial killer targeting the gay community. It takes dogged determination and new technology to bring Richard Rogers reign of terror to an end.
141	7	"Trail of Terror"	Knoxville, Tennessee	December 16, 2021
The murder of a vibrant 21-year-old Johnia Berry leaves a peaceful community questioning its core values. But a family's persistence reminds Marble City what it is made of and residents band together to bring a killer down.
142	8	"Secrets in a Small Town"	Burlington, North Carolina	December 23, 2021
Burlington, North Carolina—a town built on family, God, and Southern hospitality is shaken to its core when a local Sunday school teacher Sara Dixon is brutally murdered. Soon the community learns that even the most upstanding families can have dark secrets.

== Season 13 ==
No. overall	No. in season	Title	Location	Original release date
143	1	"Boston's Little Girl Lost"	Boston, Massachusetts	March 23, 2023
When an infant's body washes up on the shores, residents rally to find out who she is, and what happened to her. The unprecedented solidarity of the community receives nationwide attention, helping police to solve a heartbreaking case of Bella Bond.
144	2	"The Telltale Creek"	Hope Mills, North Carolina	March 30, 2023
People are on edge when high school freshman Danielle Locklear vanishes. When she turns up dead three weeks later, the community rallies to flush out the killer.
145	3	"Peace Love and Murder in Marin"	Concord, California	April 6, 2023
Law enforcement chase an elusive killer through three counties and multiple crime scenes to unravel a twisted tale of terror. In the end, five murders were tied to a cult led by Glenn Helzer.
146	4	"San Sabas Deadly Harvest"	San Saba, Texas	April 13, 2023
An historic town is stunned when a popular caretaker is found dead and a beloved, wealthy resident goes missing. But with support from a concerned community, detectives uncover the deep rooted secrets that led to murder.
147	5	"Big Island Blow Out"	Hilo, Hawaii	April 20, 2023
When Brittany Royal's body is found in the ocean, accusations threaten to hurt the Big Island's local community.
148	6	"Devastation in Delta Township"	Delta Township, Michigan	April 27, 2023
When well-liked couple Michael and Terri Greene are gunned down in their home, residents become terrified. Investigators discover that the murderer had accidentally left a trail of digital electronic evidence.
149	7	"Murder on Mirror Lake"	Sarasota, Florida	May 4, 2023
A quiet neighborhood wakes up to a nightmare when 76-year-old Henry Caneva is found strangled to death. Detectives believe his death is the result of a long-held grudge.
150	8	"Death Comes to Battletown"	Berryville, Virginia	May 11, 2023
When a 59-year-old city official Gail Smith is gunned down, shocked residents are left wondering who among them is a cold-blooded killer.
151	9	"Nightmare in New England"	East Millinocket, Maine	May 18, 2023
A town is brought to its knees when a popular teen turns up dead. For 38 years, answers elude police. However, with the help of a dedicated mother and helpful locals that never forgets, the secret killer is finally exposed.
152	10	"The Dark Days of Bucks County"	Bucks County, Pennsylvania	May 25, 2023
People are alarmed when several young men vanish one after the other within a week. With the support of residents, detectives unearth a ruthless murder spree in this seemingly picture-perfect farming community.

== Season 14 ==
No. overall	No. in season	Title	Location	Original release date
153	1	"Abducted in Anchorage"	Anchorage, Alaska	June 6, 2025
Folks are shaken to their core when a popular barista Samantha Koenig goes missing.
154	2	"Bourbon City Horror"	Georgetown, Kentucky	June 13, 2025
In 2002, Diane Snellen is found brutally murdered. For nearly a year, police struggle to solve the mystery; but a lucky break points detectives to unlikely suspects.
155	3	"Kansas Creeper"	Leawood, Kansas	June 20, 2025
Ali Kemp is found dead at the community swimming pool, causing a wave of terror to flood. A determined father helps police drive the investigation.
156	4	"Soldier Down at Fort Meade"	Severn, Maryland	June 27, 2025
The military community is shocked when Karlyn Ramirez is shot to death. For nearly a year, investigators from multiple law enforcement agencies work tirelessly to uncover a tale of secrets and lies.
157	5	"Midnight Pain in Georgia"	Marietta, Georgia	July 11, 2025
Holiday spirit disappears when Jerry Moore is found murdered in his own home. To solve the mystery, police rely on residents who help uncover a treacherous plot.
158	6	"The Lost Boy Of Haddon Township"	Haddon Township, New Jersey	July 18, 2025
A quiet suburb is turned upside down when 3-year old Brendan Creato goes missing. Residents band together to search streets and parks, and help detectives to find the toddler in their close-knit community.
159	7	"Homicide In Little Haiti"	Spring Valley, New York	July 25, 2025
In 1994, the Haitian community is rocked when a well-respected civic leader Rene Charles is murdered. It takes police nearly two decades to sift through the rumors and solve a mystery filled with lies and dark secrets.
160	8	"California Scheming"	Redlands, California	August 1, 2025
When Kelley Bullwinkle goes missing, a distraught community bands together to help find her. But when the case shifts from missing to murder, everyone learns their tranquil little town has a much darker side.
161	9	"Sun, Sand And Secrets On Singer Island"	Singer Island, Florida	August 8, 2025
A beach paradise quickly becomes a living hell when a beloved local couple Chris Benedetto and Janette Piro goes missing. Family, friends and the FBI step in to help, and what they find is a twisted case of jealousy, greed and betrayal.
162	10	"Hartford's Fallen Star"	Hartford, Wisconsin	August 8, 2025
When accomplished young musician and stage actress Jessie Blodgett is found lifeless in her own bed, no one can figure out what happened.
163	11	"Holy Terror In The Heartland"	Oakwood, Illinois	August 8, 2025
A deadly church bombing sends law enforcement scrambling for answers. Then another attack happens. As the community relies on its faith, investigators must hunt down the elusive bomber. Vermilion County, Illinois bombings
