= California Fever =

California Fever may refer to:

- California Fever (TV series), an American teen drama series that ran on CBS
- Coccidioidomycosis, a fungal disease caused by Coccidioides immitis or Coccidioides posadasii
