= Barbara Stager =

American murderer

- Born: Barbara Terry; October 30, 1948 (age 77)
- Other name: Barbara Ford
- Spouse(s): Larry Ford; Allison Russell Stager III (Russell Stager)
- Status: Incarcerated
- Conviction: First degree murder
- Penalty: Death; commuted to life imprisonment

Details
- Victims: Allison Russell Stager III
- Date: February 1, 1988
- Country: U.S.
- State: North Carolina
- Location: Durham
- Weapon: .25 caliber pistol

Barbara Stager (née Terry; formerly Ford; born October 30, 1948) is an American woman who was convicted in 1989 of murdering her husband, Allison Russell Stager III (Russell Stager), the previous year. Russell was shot while in bed; Barbara reported the shooting as accidental. Her first husband, Larry Ford, had also been killed under similar circumstances a decade earlier.

Stager was originally sentenced to death but that sentence was overturned on a procedural issue, and the life sentence she subsequently received by a different jury made her eligible for parole in 2009. She has been denied parole but has privileges which allow her to eat outside the prison complex provided she is accompanied by a court-approved sponsor.

== In media ==
"Till Death Do Us Part: The Barbara Stager Story", is an episode of A&E's television series American Justice, which profiled the case. Jerry Bledsoe wrote a book in 1994 about the case, entitled Before He Wakes: A True Story of Money, Marriage, Sex and Murder, which was later made into a TV movie in 1998 with the same title starring Jaclyn Smith. A&E's City Confidential presented its perspective on the case in the 2003 episode "Durham: Dangerous Housewife". Investigation Discovery's Deadly Women series portrayed the story in the 2010 "Fortune Hunters" episode and their Scorned: Love Kills revisited the case in its own "'Til Debt Do Us Part", in 2012. The Forensic Files series had an episode "Broken Promises" about this case; Investigation Discovery examined the case a third time in 2015, with an episode entitled "No Accident" in its Fatal Vows series.

In 1999, the Discovery Channel's The New Detectives series, Season 4, Episode 6, "Women Who Kill" featured Barbara Stager's crime.
