= Robert L. Freedman =

American dramatist

- Born: July 27, 1957 (age 69); Los Angeles, California, United States
- Education: University of California, Los Angeles and New York University's Tisch School of the Arts.
- Occupations: screenwriter; dramatist
- Notable work: A Gentleman's Guide to Love and Murder

Robert L. Freedman (born July 27, 1957) is an American screenwriter and dramatist. He is best known for his teleplays for Rodgers & Hammerstein's Cinderella (1997) and Life with Judy Garland: Me and My Shadows (2001), and for his Tony-winning book and lyrics of A Gentleman's Guide to Love and Murder (2014).

== Early life and education ==
Freedman attended Los Alamitos High School, where he was the editor of the school’s newspaper. That's where he met another influential figure in his life, a journalism teacher named Margaret Hall.

He attended the University of California, Los Angeles and New York University's Tisch School of the Arts. He holds Masters of Fine Arts from NYU in Dramatic Writing and Musical Theatre Writing.

== Career ==
Freedman won the 1994 Writers Guild of America Award for Outstanding Television Children's Show for his script for the TV movie A Deadly Secret: The Robert Bierer Story (1993). He was the screenwriter for the TV movie Rodgers and Hammerstein's Cinderella (1997), and received a nomination for the Writers Guild of America Award for Outstanding Children's Script.

Freedman is the screenwriter and producer of the television movie Life with Judy Garland: Me and My Shadows, which was televised on ABC in 2001. The movie, about the early life of Judy Garland, was based on the book Me and My Shadows: A Family Memoir by Lorna Luft. Among other awards, Freedman was nominated by the Writers Guild of America, "Adapted Long Form". He was also nominated for the Primetime Emmy Award for Outstanding Writing For a Miniseries or a Movie, a Co-Nominee for the 2001 Primetime Emmy Award for Outstanding Miniseries.

He wrote the book for the stage musical Grand Duchy, with music by John Bayless, which had staged readings at Playwrights Horizons and the Paper Mill Playhouse and premiered in Santa Barbara, California, in 2003. A second performance, also in Santa Barbara, was expected spring of 2016.

He wrote the book to a musical titled Campaign of the Century, with lyrics by Freedman and Steven Lutvak and music by Lutvak. It is based on the book by Greg Mitchell, and is about the smear campaign against author Upton Sinclair. It had staged readings at the Chicago Humanities Festival in 2004, the New York Music Festival in September 2005, and the Beverly Hills Theatre Guild in 2006.

Freedman co-wrote a one-man play with Faye Greenberg titled The Beast of Broadway, which had its premiere in 2010 at TheatreZone, Naples, Florida. The play is based in part on the book The Abominable Showman by Howard Kissell, about the producer David Merrick.

Freedman wrote the book and lyrics to a musical version of Kind Hearts and Coronets, with music and lyrics by Steven Lutvak, directed by Ron Lagomarsino, which was presented at the Sundance Institute Theatre Laboratory, Utah, in July 2006. The musical had a staged reading in the Breaking Ground Series at the Huntington Theatre in Boston in April 2006. A Gentleman's Guide to Love and Murder, co-written with Lutvak and based on the 1907 novel Israel Rank by Roy Horniman (the source for Kind Hearts and Coronets), ultimately premiered in October 2012 at Hartford Stage in Hartford, Connecticut. The production, directed by Darko Tresnjak, transferred to the Old Globe Theatre in San Diego, California, in March 2013, and then opened on Broadway in 2014. Freedman won the Tony Award for Best Book of a Musical for this musical.

== Work ==
=== Television ===
Sources: The New York Times, filmreference.com

- The Royal Romance of Charles and Diana (1982)
- Broadway Sings: The Music of Jule Styne (1987)
- Taken Away (1989)
- Locked Up: A Mother's Rage (1991)
- Woman With A Past (1992)
- A Deadly Secret: The Robert Bierer Story (1992)
- Honor Thy Mother (1992)
- In the Best of Families: Marriage, Pride & Madness (1994)
- What Love Sees (1996)
- Mrs. Santa Claus (1997)
- Unlikely Angel (1997)
- Rodgers & Hammerstein's Cinderella (1997)
- Long Way Home (1998)
- What Makes a Family (2001)
- Life with Judy Garland: Me and My Shadows (2001)
- Murder in the Hamptons (2005)
- The Pastor's Wife (2011)

=== Theatre ===
- Grand Duchy (with John Bayless)
- Campaign of the Century (with Steven Lutvak)
- The Beast of Broadway: The Life and Times of David Merrick (with Faye Greenberg) (2010)
- A Gentleman's Guide to Love and Murder (with Steven Lutvak)
- Camp Rock: The Musical (with Faye Greenberg)

== Honors and awards ==
Year	Award	Category	Nominated Work	Result
1983, 1984	ASCAP Popular Award for Musical Theatre		Grand Duchy	Won
1993	Edgar Award	Best TV Feature or MiniSeries	Honor Thy Mother	Nominated
1994	Writers Guild Award	Outstanding Television Children's Show	A Deadly Secret: The Robert Bierer Story	Won
1996	Chicago International Television Festival	Silver Plaque	What Love Sees	Won
1999	Writers Guild Award	Outstanding Children's Script	Rodgers and Hammerstein's Cinderella	Nominated
2001	Humanitas Prize		What Makes a Family	Finalist
2001	GLAAD Award	Best TV Film	What Makes a Family	Won
2001	Emmy Award	Outstanding Writing for a Miniseries or Movie	Life with Judy Garland: Me and My Shadows	Nominated
2001	Emmy Award	Outstanding Miniseries	Life with Judy Garland: Me and My Shadows	Nominated
2001	Television Critics Association Award		Life with Judy Garland: Me and My Shadows	Won
2001	Broadcast Critics Association Award		Life with Judy Garland: Me and My Shadows	Won
2001	Golden Satellite Award	Best TV Movie or Miniseries	Life with Judy Garland: Me and My Shadows	Won
2001	Golden Globe Award	Best TV Movie or Miniseries	Life with Judy Garland: Me and My Shadows	Nominated
2002	Writers Guild Award		Life with Judy Garland: Me and My Shadows	Nominated
2006	California Musical Theatre Award		Campaign of the Century	Won
2006	Edward Kleban Award (with Steven Lutvak)			Won
2006	Fred Ebb Award (with Steven Lutvak)			Won
2014	Tony Award	Best Book of a Musical	A Gentleman's Guide to Love and Murder	Won
