= Cruel Doubt =

1992 film directed by Yves Simoneau

- Based on: Cruel Doubt by Joe McGinniss
- Screenplay by: John Gay
- Story by: Joe McGinniss
- Directed by: Yves Simoneau
- Starring: Blythe Danner; Matt McGrath; Ed Asner; Adam Baldwin; Gwyneth Paltrow
- Theme music composer: George S. Clinton
- Country of origin: United States
- Original language: English

Production
- Producer: Susan Baerwald
- Cinematography: Elliot Davis
- Editors: Rick Fields; Michael Ornstein
- Running time: 187 min.
- Production companies: Susan Baerwald Productions; NBC Productions

Original release
- Network: NBC
- Release: May 17 – May 19, 1992

Related
- Blind Faith (1990)

Cruel Doubt is a 1992 miniseries starring Blythe Danner and Matt McGrath, as well as Danner's daughter, Gwyneth Paltrow. The film was broadcast in two parts on NBC in the United States and on CTV in Canada on May 17 and May 19, 1992.

Ed Asner, Adam Baldwin and Dennis Farina also star.

The miniseries is based on the 1991 true crime book Cruel Doubt by Joe McGinniss, which documents the 1988 murder of Lieth Von Stein by his stepson, Chris Pritchard, and two friends, James Upchurch and Gerald Neal Henderson.

== Plot ==
In their bedroom asleep one night, Bonnie and Lieth Von Stein are violently attacked and stabbed by home intruders. Bonnie barely survives, but her husband does not.

The investigation into who could do such a thing, and for what purpose, takes an unexpected twist when Bonnie's son Chris Pritchard becomes a prime suspect in the case. Police theorize that it is possible Chris provided two friends from school, Henderson and Upchurch, with a detailed map to the Von Stein family's home, resulting in his mother and stepfather being assaulted while Chris was away at college and his sister Angela asleep in her own bedroom at home.

The savagery of the crime and the absurdity of the charge leads Bonnie to hire attorney Bill Osteen to represent Chris, in as much as she finds it impossible that he could have played a role in her husband's murder. The more police investigate, however, the more Osteen tries to prepare Bonnie that her son may indeed be involved, and that even Angela may know more than she has been telling.

== Cast ==
- Blythe Danner as Bonnie Von Stein
- Matt McGrath as Chris Pritchard
- Ed Asner as Bill Osteen
- Gwyneth Paltrow as Angela Pritchard
- Denis Arndt as Lieth Von Stein
- Neal McDonough as Henderson
- Travis Fine as Upchurch
- Adam Baldwin as Detective Taylor
- Dennis Farina as Tom Brereton
- William Forsythe as Chief Crone
- Miguel Ferrer as Louis Young
- Louise Latham as Polly Bates
- G.D. Spradlin as George Bates
- John C. McGinley as Jim Vosburgh

== Production ==
Although the film brought much attention to the murder of Von Stein, players of the role-playing game Dungeons & Dragons have criticized it for unfairly placing blame for the murders upon the game. The film featured the actual Advanced Dungeons & Dragons first-edition rulebook (which by then was a multi-million dollar best-seller) but with a piece of artwork visibly pasted into the pages of the book (depicting an orc with a dagger and backpack similar to the ones in the murder depicted), implying that it had caused the murders.

Another television film based on the same case, Honor Thy Mother, aired on CBS a few weeks prior to Cruel Doubt.
