= Honor Thy Mother (film) =

1992 television film

- Based on: Blood Games by Jerry Bledsoe
- Written by: Richard DeLong Adams; Robert L. Freedman
- Directed by: David Greene
- Starring: Sharon Gless; Brian Wimmer; William McNamara
- Country of origin: United States
- Original language: English

Original release
- Network: CBS
- Release: April 26, 1992

Honor Thy Mother is a 1992 American television film directed by David Greene and written by Richard DeLong Adams and Robert L. Freedman, based on the non-fiction book Blood Games by Jerry Bledsoe.

== Synopsis ==
The true crime story recounts the murder of Lieth Von Stein, and stars Sharon Gless, Brian Wimmer, and William McNamara. The film was considered a ratings hit.

== Related ==
Another television film based on the same murder case, Cruel Doubt, aired on NBC a few weeks after Honor Thy Mother.
