= Stuart Alexander (murderer) =

American businessman and murderer

Stuart Charles Alexander
- Born: March 22, 1961; San Leandro, California, U.S.
- Died: December 27, 2005 (aged 44); San Quentin, California, U.S.
- Other name: "The Sausage King" (self-proclaimed name)
- Occupations: Businessman, owner of Santos Linguisa Factory, political candidate
- Convictions: 2004
- Criminal charges: Three counts of first-degree murder
- Penalty: Death by lethal injection (died while on death row)

Stuart Charles Alexander (March 22, 1961 – December 27, 2005), nicknamed "the Sausage King," was an American businessman, political candidate and murderer. Alexander was the owner of the Santos Linguisa Factory in San Leandro, California, a family business which was founded by Alexander's aunt, Pia Santos, and her husband, Antonio, in San Leandro, California, in 1921. In 2004, Alexander was convicted of the murders of three state and USDA meat compliance officials in 2000.

== Personal background ==
=== Early life and family ===
Born the middle child of three sons of Shirley Eckhart (born 1934) and Herman "Tweedy" Alexander (1934–1993), Stuart Alexander, whose paternal family roots could be traced back to Portugal, was a lifelong resident of San Leandro, California. In 1993, after the death of his father, Alexander inherited his family business, the Santos Linguisa Factory and proclaimed himself "the Sausage King." Alexander's father, Tweedy, had been well known in local and national business circles as a successful businessman and was recognized and renowned for making linguiça sausage. He groomed the young Alexander for years, particularly after the death of his eldest son, Stephen (1958–1977), who died at the age of 18 in a motorcycle accident. Stephen was set to inherit the reins of the company, but after his death, it was inherited by Stuart instead. Tweedy had little faith that Stuart could run the company. He was also verbally abusive to Stuart, often telling him that he would "never amount to anything."

=== Relations with others ===
According to Alexander's mother, who divorced Tweedy when Alexander was ten, Tweedy could at times be very demanding with his son, and "yelled at him all the time," especially when, at times at the factory during summers and weekends, a young Alexander made a mistake. Coupled with this and the breakup of his parents' marriage in 1971, Alexander cultivated a deep-seated anger and resentment from a young age that often manifested violently in relations with other people.

Alexander, who was described by some who knew him closely to have a "short fuse," and to be at times "combative," was charged with beating Clifford Berg, 75, an elderly neighbor, after an argument in 1996. One person who owned a printing shop near the linguiça factory, Richard Miller, stated during the murder trial before the grand jury, that Alexander "didn't like the idea of people telling him what to do" with his business, and that he was "very anti-authority."

== Circumstances leading to murders ==
It was alleged by those who were close to him that Alexander would often keep and show-off emails and letters from the meat compliance officers who he felt were harassing him. Perhaps partially inspired by the perceived harassment of the state and USDA inspection practices, Alexander made a bid for San Leandro Mayoral Office in 1998. The campaign failed when it was published that he had previously attacked an elderly neighbor.

Alexander began a romantic relationship with Eve Elder, a 33-year-old insurance claims agent, around 1995. Over the course of the relationship, Elder allegedly saw signs of resentment and a potential violent streak in Alexander, especially when commenting about the inspectors. In what had started out as a joke, the couple concocted a series of short stories; one, titled "Sausage Sniffers Found Sauced," painted a description of the inspectors drowning in vats of "secret sauce." As another former girlfriend, Charlotte Knapp, 38, who had been seeing Alexander on-and-off up until the time of the murders, would later testify during the murder trial, Alexander frequently used profanities to describe the inspectors and would become confrontational with them or toward anyone else who he deemed as "trespassers" at his factory. He allegedly occasionally wielded a gun and kept several firearms in his office desk drawer (including a 9mm Beretta and a .380 Walther).

Over time, Alexander also began to cultivate an increasingly antagonistic and contentious relationship with the four inspectors who were regularly assigned to oversee his business operations in terms of "cooking temperature, cleanliness, and other health concerns." Alexander felt that the inspectors were harassing him unnecessarily and "interfering with the way his sausage was best made, and had always been made by his family" by demanding that his linguiça be smoked at 140 degrees Fahrenheit, which was a state and USDA requirement. Alexander, who usually smoked the linguiça at 110 degrees Fahrenheit, feared that the increased cooking temperature would shrink the sausages, thereby reducing the price at which he could sell them. There were also requirements about the type of smoker that could be used; his had been deemed antiquated and outdated. On at least two occasions, the inspectors ordered that the factory be shut down until Alexander complied with their directives, only for Alexander to reopen it against state law. Taking out bank loans to reopen the factory caused the once-thriving, now-illegally operated factory to lose more and more money.

By the time that the murder trial proceedings began, Elder, as had Knapp sometime beforehand, had broken off her relationship with Alexander.

== Santos Linguisa Factory murders ==
At the time leading up to the murders, Alexander had again reopened the factory against state law and had posted a sign at the front of the factory that read, "To all our great customers, the USDA is coming into our plant harassing my employees and me, making it impossible to make our great product. Gee, if all meat plants could be in business for 79 years without one complaint, the meat inspectors would not have jobs. Therefore, we are taking legal action against them."

On Wednesday, June 21, 2000, four inspectors arrived at the factory for an inspection and to cite Alexander for illegally operating his factory. Jean Hillery, 56, and Tom Quadros, 52, were compliance officers from the U.S. Department of Agriculture. William Shaline, 57, and Earl Willis, 51, were health inspectors from the California Department of Food and Agriculture. Alexander was initially not present at the factory as he was out making a delivery. The inspectors were allowed inside by a factory worker. After Alexander returned to the factory sometime later, he angrily confronted the inspectors and ordered them to leave. The inspectors called the police to provide protection for them, while Alexander made a phone call of his own to the police, accusing the inspectors of trespassing and demanding that they be removed. Both calls were treated as low-priority. The inspectors decided that Willis would go outside and wait for the police to arrive, while the other three inspectors would remain inside the factory's lobby.

Shortly after Willis stepped outside, a still angry but calm-appearing Alexander went into his office, retrieved one of his guns from his office drawer, reentered the lobby and opened fire on Hillery, Quadros and Shaline. Willis, who heard the gunshots, immediately sprinted away from the factory. Alexander then exited the factory and chased after Willis, firing five shots in Willis's direction but missing. A video recording of Alexander chasing Willis down the street was captured by a proprietor of a nearby business. Willis, who was unharmed, managed to escape into a nearby bank.

After Alexander's failed attempt to shoot Willis, he returned to the factory and emptied three more shots into the heads of Hillery, Quadros and Shaline to make sure that they were dead. The police soon arrived upon the scene after someone in the bank notified the police department. Upon their arrival, Alexander was standing in front of the factory, admitting to the murders and ready to be taken into custody.

== Legal proceedings ==
=== Murder trial ===
Court proceedings for the trial of Alexander in the slayings of the compliance officers began on May 2, 2004. The prosecution team introduced forensic evidence as well as the security video from inside the plant; it recorded the events from the time that the meat inspectors were waiting in the factory lobby for the police, who never came, to arrive, until the shooting of the inspectors at point-blank range. Alexander had unwittingly sealed his fate: He had the video system installed in all of the rooms of the factory. The prosecutors also introduced the videotaped footage of the chase of Willis by Alexander. The prosecutors aimed to show signs of premeditation in committing the murders. They also introduced the humorous "secret sauce" letter Alexander and his ex-girlfriend Eve Elder had written together several years before.

The defense attorneys began to prepare Alexander for at least an insanity plea, if not a second-degree murder defense, in order to stave off a possible death sentence if he were convicted. They introduced excerpts of the "harassing" emails and official letters made by the inspectors in hopes to show that his act of murder was out of "blind rage." Alexander, who had been held without bail since the time of the shootings, pleaded not guilty to first-degree murder charges.

=== Conviction ===
On October 19, 2004, Alexander was convicted of three counts of first-degree murder, making him eligible to receive the death penalty. On December 14, 2004, a jury condemned Alexander to death by lethal injection. He was convicted of the murders and sentenced to death on February 15, 2005.

=== Alexander's death and aftermath of trial ===
While awaiting execution on California's death row at San Quentin State Prison, Alexander, who had gained some 80 pounds during the four years in custody until his trial, began to experience health problems. On December 27, 2005, Alexander was found dead in his prison cell. It was eventually determined that he had died of a pulmonary embolism. The factory was eventually closed, and the factory premises at 1746 Washington Avenue in San Leandro sat vacant (as of 2010) behind the Washington Club, a bar that has always shared the building with the factory. The story was reported nationally and was documented on the A&E Channel's City Confidential program in a 2005 episode "The Sausage King, Episode #133". The case was also spotlighted (focusing specifically on the interactions between Alexander and Jean Hillery) in a similarly titled 2011 episode of the Investigation Discovery program Fatal Encounters.

=== Memorial ceremonies for inspectors ===
In June 2010, a memorial service event was held at the USDA Food Safety and Inspection Service Alameda, California District Office commemorating the service of the four inspectors, the memory of the three who were slain in the gun attack and Earl Willis, who died in 2008 of cancer. FSIS also held several related special ceremonies commemorating the lives and service of all of the inspectors in Washington, D.C., which was a two-day event held on the corner of NW 14th and Jefferson Streets, where decorations with memorial service ribbons were given to the families of the inspectors. FSIS also held ceremonies in Beltsville, Maryland, and Alameda. The agency also maintains a memorial page to remind employees and the public of the sacrifice made by the inspectors.
