= Signal Mountain murders =

1988 killings in Tennessee, US

The Signal Mountain murders refers to a widely publicized case in 1988 involving the shootings of Richard Mason, his son in law Kenneth Griffith, and Earl Smock near Chattanooga, Tennessee.

== Missing men ==
The three men had been riding the backwoods of Signal Mountain. The men were missing and being searched for by their relatives when they did not return home. The bodies were found off Big Fork Road near the community of Suck Creek by a resident while their all-terrain vehicles (ATVs) were found down an embankment on the side of Roberts Mill Road.

== Suspect ==
The owners of the land were Frank Casteel and his wife, Susie. When Frank noticed more and more people intruding on his land he consulted a police officer who advised him to keep a logbook of everyone he witnessed. Multiple witnesses would later recall Frank making statements to them about his frustrations with trespassers, saying “he would kill if he had to.” The men were later found dead and Casteel was a prime suspect. A witness later reported seeing Susie washing blood out of the couple's Jeep. Larry Sneed (?) had taken possession of the logbook in 1988.

== Conviction ==
Casteel was sentenced to life in prison. An appeal was made and eventually given an opportunity to overturn Casteel’s conviction in 2001. In 2003 Frank Casteel was found guilty again for the triple homicide and returned to prison.

== Death ==
Casteel died in prison in May 2019 at the age of 71.

In 2020, Casteel's son Franklin Trever Casteel authored a book on the subject.

== Media depictions ==
- Unsolved Mysteries aired a segment regarding the murders in season 2 episode 13 which aired on January 3, 1990.
- A&E (TV channel) covered the murders in season 3, episode 10, of their City Confidential series. The title of the episode was "Dangerous Trespassing".
- Investigation Discovery portrayed the murders in the show "Bloodlands" on August 18, 2014. This was season 1 episode 3 titled "Signal Mountain Murders".
