= Bitter Blood =

Book by Jerry Bledsoe

- Front cover of Bitter Blood
- Author: Jerry Bledsoe
- Language: English
- Genre: True crime
- Publisher: Dutton
- Publication date: 1988
- Publication place: United States
- Media type: Print (hardcover), audio
- Pages: 468

Bitter Blood: A True Story of Southern Family Pride, Madness, and Multiple Murder (1988) is a non-fiction crime tragedy written by American author Jerry Bledsoe that reached #1 on the New York Times bestseller list. Bitter Blood is composed of various newspaper articles (from the Greensboro News and Record) and personal eyewitness accounts of several homicides in 1984 and 1985. The setting for the majority of the book is Rockingham County and Guilford County in rural North Carolina.

== Synopsis ==
In July 1984, Delores Lynch and her daughter Janie were found murdered on their four-acre estate in Oldham County, Kentucky. With little evidence left behind by the killer, detectives questioned Delores' son Tom, who stood to inherit the estate but was eventually eliminated as a suspect.

Tom had been married to Susie Newsom, the niece of North Carolina Supreme Court chief justice Susie Sharp. Delores Lynch had never approved of Susie, and increasing marital friction led Tom to begin an affair with his dental assistant, prompting a contentious divorce and custody battle. Ten months after the murders, Newsom’s parents and grandmother were shot to death in their home in Winston-Salem. Since Newsom's father had agreed to testify in favor of Tom in the custody case, police began to speculate that she had played a role in the killings.

Newsom became a prime suspect along with her cousin, Fritz Klenner, an unlicensed physician in Reidsville. On June 3, 1985, before investigators could make an arrest, Klenner fired on police officers when they attempted to raid his Greensboro apartment. Klenner, Newsom, and her two children fled from the scene, resulting in a low-speed police chase.

When Klenner's SUV was stopped, he opened fire with a machine gun, wounding three officers. Before police were able to respond, Klenner detonated an explosive charge inside the vehicle, killing himself and his three passengers. Autopsies performed on the children reveal that both of the boys had ingested cyanide before they were shot in their heads at close range. Later, the authorities determine that Newsom ignited the explosives in the SUV.

== Aftermath ==
North Carolina family murders
- Location: United States of America; Reidsville, North Carolina; Oldham County, Kentucky; Winston-Salem, North Carolina; Greensboro, North Carolina
- Date: July 22, 1984 - June 3, 1985
- Target: Ex-husband's family and perpetrator's family
- Attack type: mass murder, filicide, suicide bombing
- Deaths: 9 (including both perpetrators)
- Injuries: 3
- Perpetrators: Susie Newsom and Fritz Klenner

In the wake of the deaths on June 3, 1985, a forensics analysis was performed on the bodies of Fritz, Susie, John, and Jim. Both boys were found to have high levels of cyanide in their blood in addition to gunshot wounds to their heads. It is assumed that due to the poisoning, both children were unconscious during the police's chase, and either Susie or Fritz fatally shot both of them just prior to the explosion of the bomb. Susie's body was mangled from the waist down and many pieces of the seat were deeply embedded in her corpse. This discovery led investigators to believe that the bomb was positioned underneath her seat, on the passenger side of Fritz's Blazer. Police officers found Fritz alive among the wreckage; however, he soon died from internal hemorrhaging.

The following day, June 4, the police searched the Klenner household and found numerous firearms, explosives, and prescription drugs. Over 15 guns, 30,000 rounds of ammunition, grenades, illegal military equipment, and a couple of claymores were found at Fritz's house. The police also found a case and a half of dynamite that was stored behind the Klenner residence. It is assumed that the missing half-case of dynamite was the cause of the explosion in the car. Inside Fritz's office, the police found evidence which showed that he was an admirer of Adolf Hitler as well as an avid supporter of the Ku Klux Klan.

While it is commonly believed that Fritz Klenner had both the means and the motive to commit the murders, it cannot be proven beyond a ballistics report that linked a bullet which was found at the scene of the Lynch killings to a gun that Klenner and Susie sold to a North Carolina gun dealer. Susie's role in the murders still remains unknown. The prevailing theories are that she either convinced Klenner to commit the murders on her behalf, so she had foreknowledge of the crimes; or she had none, and she blindly refused to consider the possibility that Klenner was involved, seeing any attempt to investigate his possible role by the state as unreasonable persecution.

Another figure in the case was Ian Perkins, a 21-year-old neighbor of Klenner's. Ian Perkins knew about Fritz's involvement in the murders of Susie's family, since he had driven Klenner to their homes. Klenner had told Perkins that the murders were a CIA operation. In 1985, Perkins went on trial and he was sentenced to serve four months in jail followed by over five years of probation; as of 2005, he was seeking a state pardon. Perkins was spared a life sentence thanks to a note from Fritz Klenner that read, "“I’ll write a paper saying you were not knowingly involved, that you believed you were on a covert mission for the government." The judge noted Ian's naiveté, gullibility, and immaturity as mitigating factors in his sentencing.

Prior to the murders, in 1981, the SBI (State Bureau of Investigation) was given anonymous information that Fritz Klenner was "a dangerous psychopath who was practicing medicine without a license." However, no investigation ensued after the discovery of this information. In retrospect, the attorney general of North Carolina, Rufus L. Edmisten, said that this vital piece of information was never brought to his attention. Edmisten later admitted that he wished he had done something about the situation prior to its escalation.

== Adaptations ==
In 1994, a television movie based upon the novel was produced, titled In the Best of Families: Marriage, Pride & Madness, and directed by Jeff Bleckner. In the Best of Families has a runtime of 200 minutes and it was originally released and played on CBS in a two part series on January 16 and 18, 1994. It is re-run on cable under the title Bitter Blood. The story was also adapted for an episode of Southern Fried Homicide on Investigation Discovery. On June 28, 2015, Snapped: Killer Couples aired an episode about the crime.

== See also ==
- Murders of Andrew Bagby and Zachary Turner
- Murder of Carol DiMaiti
- Powell family murders
- Murder of Hannah Clarke
