= Murder of Cara Knott =

1986 murder

Cara Evelyn Knott
- Born: February 11, 1966; Ventura, California, U.S.
- Died: December 27, 1986 (aged 20); San Diego County, California, U.S.
- Cause of death: Strangulation
- Body discovered: December 28, 1986, near Mercy Road bridge on Interstate 15

Cara Evelyn Knott (February 11, 1966 – December 27, 1986) was an American student at San Diego State University who disappeared on December 27, 1986, while driving from her boyfriend's home in Escondido, California, to her parents' house in El Cajon. The following day, December 28, Knott's car was found on a dead-end road at the Mercy Road offramp from Interstate 15 in San Diego County. Her body was recovered at the bottom of a 65 ft (20 m) ravine nearby.

Knott's killer, Craig Alan Peyer (born March 16, 1950), was a police officer and thirteen-year veteran of the California Highway Patrol (CHP). At his trial, it was revealed that Peyer had been targeting women along the interstate and had made predatory sexual advances on multiple female drivers during traffic stops. He was convicted of Knott's murder in 1988.

== Murder ==
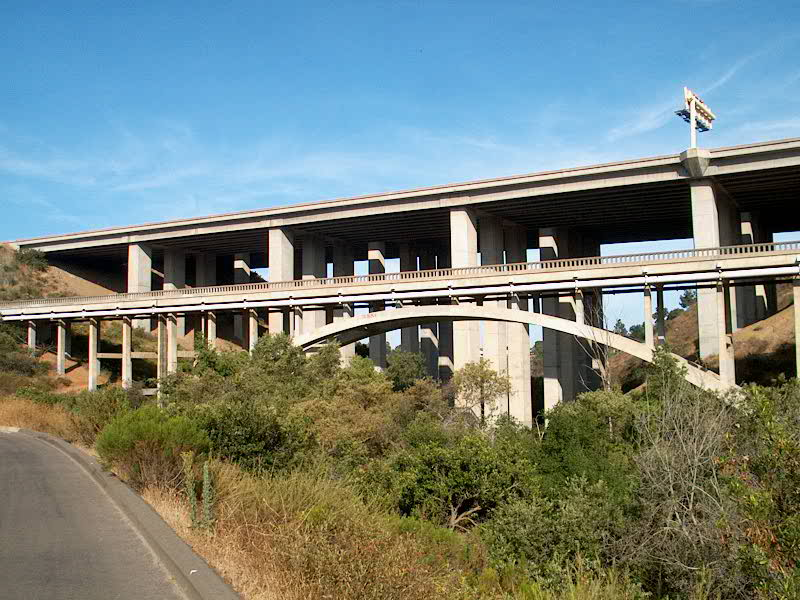
Scene of the crime.

On the night of December 27, 1986, twenty-year-old Cara Knott was driving south on Interstate 15 from her boyfriend's home in Escondido, California, to her parents' home in El Cajon when Craig Peyer, who was on duty in a marked California Highway Patrol (CHP) vehicle, directed Knott to pull off the freeway on an isolated, unfinished offramp. It was later discovered that Peyer also had been harassing several other female drivers in the same area by pulling them over on the same offramp, supposedly trying to pick them up as dates. In the Knott case, it was believed that the situation escalated to physicality when Knott threatened to report Peyer for his inappropriate actions. When he attempted to grab her, she slashed and scratched at his face. Peyer then bludgeoned her with his flashlight and strangled her to death with a rope. He then threw her body over the edge of the Los Peñasquitos Creek Arch Bridge, where she fell into the brush below.

Coincidentally, two days later, while covering the investigation of the murder, a reporter with San Diego station KCST-TV interviewed Peyer during a ride-along segment about self-protection for female drivers. At the time of the interview, Peyer had scratches on his face which, as details of the case unfolded, were thought to have been inflicted by Knott during the struggle with him. Peyer claimed the scratches were caused when he fell against a fence in the CHP parking lot, but the fence was found to be too high to have caused them. Moreover, within about an hour of when the murder was thought to have occurred, witnesses at a gas station saw a dishevelled Peyer drive in at high speed.

== Investigation ==
Just after the KCST broadcast, nearly two dozen telephone calls, mostly from women, were received by authorities, with the callers reporting that Peyer was the officer who had pulled them over on the same offramp, even though in these cases Peyer was not hostile or violent towards them. They said that while Peyer may have been friendly with them, he also made them uncomfortable. In some cases, he gently stroked their hair and shoulders, which caused them some distress. In addition, several women had made complaints about Peyer before the murder, but these were dismissed because of his positive reputation within the CHP.

Knott was last seen alive at a Chevron gas station just two miles away from the murder scene. The attendant remembered seeing a marked CHP patrol car making a U-turn on the road just after Knott had driven away. Furthermore, Peyer's own logbook revealed a hasty falsification about the time of the murder, as well as changes he made to several traffic tickets that had been written sometime later, according to the motorists to whom the tickets were written. Forensic dentist Norman Sperber examined the rope found in Peyer's patrol car and determined they seemed to match the rope marks around Knott's neck, although Sperber was later barred from testifying about his findings in court.

A distinctive and unusual gold rayon fiber—found to have been made using a yellow pigment instead of a dye—found on Knott's dress matched a shoulder patch Peyer wore on his CHP uniform. Tire tracks on the bridge showed a car had pulled out hastily, leaving black marks on the pavement. A drop of blood also was found on one of Knott's boots, which was found to be consistent with Peyer's blood type (AB negative, the rarest type) and other genetic markers, although conclusive DNA testing was not available at the time of the investigation. Microscopic purple fibers also linked Peyer to Knott's murder.

An internal investigation showed that while Peyer stopped many drivers for various legitimate violations, most of them were females who were driving alone. Additionally, they were of the same age group and physical description as Knott.

== Trials ==
The first trial resulted in a hung jury, after a 7–5 split in favor of conviction. Upon retrial, testimony regarding a potential second suspect and a hearsay explanation for the defendant's scratches was ruled inadmissible. Peyer was found guilty of murder, the second conviction related to a murder by an on-duty CHP officer. On August 4, 1988, Peyer was sentenced to 25 years to life in prison.

Peyer refused to provide DNA for the test. At an initial parole hearing in 2004 after having served 17 years, when asked why he wouldn't provide a DNA sample, Peyer refused to answer. For this reason and his lack of remorse, the board denied his parole request.

== Aftermath ==
Shortly after the trial, a wave of incidents was reported when female drivers traveling alone refused to stop when ordered to by the police.

On November 30, 2000, Sam Knott, Cara Knott's father, died of a heart attack only a few yards from the site where Cara's body was discovered, where the family had constructed a memorial garden for her.

Peyer has been denied parole two additional times: in 2008 (after serving 21 years), and 2012 (after serving 25 years). His next eligibility for a parole hearing is set for January 2027, when he will be almost 77 years old. Peyer is serving his sentence at California Men's Colony in San Luis Obispo, California. At the time of his second parole hearing in 2008, he had "a nearly unblemished prison record" and "worked as an electrician at the facility" for years, making $52 per month in salary from the job in 2003. He had worked briefly as an apprentice electrician after getting fired from CHP while on bail before the trial. His third wife, Karen, whom he married 18 months before the murder and visited him regularly, divorced him around 2007.

== Media ==
The Craig Peyer case has been covered in several books:

- True Stories of Law & Order: SVU by Kevin Dwyer and Juré Fiorillo (Berkley/Penguin 2007)
- You're the Jury by Judge Norbert Enrenfreund and Lawrence Treat (Holt Paperbacks 1992)
- Badge of Betrayal: The Devastating True Story of a Rogue Cop Turned Murderer by Joe Cantlupe and Lisa Petrillo (Avon Books (Mm) 1991.)
- One Day: The Extraordinary Story of an Ordinary 24 Hours in America by Gene Weingarten (Blue Rider Press 2019)

The case was also the subject of a few episodes of different television shows:

- City Confidential: "Badge of Dishonor" (2003)
- Unusual Suspects: "Betrayal of Trust" (2011, Season 1, Episode 2) - Investigation Discovery TV series
- Forensic Files: "Badge of Betrayal" (2004, Season 9, Episode 18).

== See also ==
- Cara Knott Memorial Bridge
- Lists of solved missing person cases
- Police misconduct § United States
