= Murder of Lieth Von Stein =

High-profile murder in North Carolina (1988)

- Date: July 25, 1988
- Location: Washington, North Carolina, U.S.
- Deaths: Lieth Von Stein
- Injuries: Bonnie Von Stein
- Convicted: James Upchurch, Chris Pritchard, Neal Henderson

Lieth Peter Von Stein (Note: Spelled in some sources as Leith Von Stein.) (March 16, 1946 – July 25, 1988) was an American businessman whose murder launched a high-profile trial in North Carolina. The case became the subject of two books and two television films.

An executive at National Spinning, a textile factory in Washington, North Carolina, Von Stein was stabbed and bludgeoned to death in his home as the result of a plot devised by his stepson, Christopher Wayne Pritchard. Von Stein's wife, Bonnie (Pritchard's mother), was also attacked, but survived. Pritchard's friend James Bartlett Upchurch III was convicted of first-degree murder, while Pritchard and another co-conspirator, Gerald Neal Henderson, were convicted of aiding and abetting the murder. The trial revealed that Pritchard's motive was his desire to inherit his stepfather's fortune, derived from his family's dry cleaning chain, Camel City Dry Cleaners in Winston-Salem, North Carolina.

== Assault and murder ==
In the early morning of July 25, 1988, in the Smallwood subdivision of Washington, North Carolina, Lieth Von Stein and his wife Bonnie were attacked in their bedroom by an intruder wielding a knife and a club. Lieth was killed, but Bonnie survived with serious injuries and was able to summon aid. Lieth was stepfather to Bonnie's two children from her previous marriage, Christopher (usually known as Chris) and Angela Pritchard. Angela Pritchard, whose bedroom was in another part of the house, told police she slept through the attack. At the time of the murder, Chris Pritchard was living in a student residence at North Carolina State University.

== Police investigation ==
When it was discovered that Lieth's estate was worth two million dollars, Bonnie Von Stein and her children, Chris and Angela, became suspects. The police investigation eventually focused on Chris Pritchard. A breakthrough came when Pritchard's college friend Neal Henderson confessed to investigators that he (Henderson) had driven another friend, James "Moog" Upchurch, to and from the scene of the murder at the instigation of Pritchard, who had promised to use his projected inheritance money to reward Upchurch and Henderson if his mother and stepfather were killed. In June 1989, nearly a year after the attack, Pritchard, Henderson, and Upchurch (all born 1968) were arrested and charged with the crime.

== Trial ==
The trial took place in January 1990. Chris Pritchard, who (subsequent to his arrest) admitted to masterminding the murder conspiracy, and Neal Henderson, who said his role was that of James Upchurch's lookout and getaway driver, pleaded guilty to reduced charges as part of a plea bargain whereby they both testified against Upchurch.

Upchurch, who denied all charges, was found guilty of first degree murder, assault with a deadly weapon with intent to kill or seriously injure, conspiracy to commit murder, and burglary in the first degree. For these crimes he was sentenced, respectively, to death, 20 years, 6 years and life. Upchurch's death sentence was set aside on October 1, 1992, and he was re-sentenced to life imprisonment. He was not eligible for parole until 2022.

Pritchard was convicted of aiding and abetting in second-degree murder, and was sentenced to life imprisonment. He also received a 20-year sentence for aiding and abetting the assault on his mother, Bonnie Von Stein. He was paroled on June 2, 2007, later becoming a born-again Christian.

Henderson was also convicted of murder in the second degree (aiding and abetting), and of aiding and abetting assault with a deadly weapon with intent to kill or seriously injure. He was sentenced to 40 years imprisonment on the former charge and six years on the latter. He was paroled on December 11, 2000.

== Books and television adaptations ==
The case became the subject of two books: Joe McGinniss's Cruel Doubt and Jerry Bledsoe's Blood Games, both published in 1991. Bledsoe's book was adapted for television as Honor Thy Mother, first aired in April 1992. McGinniss's Cruel Doubt was adapted as a 2-part miniseries of the same name, aired in May 1992. Both books and television films heavily emphasized the three perpetrators' interest in the role-playing game Dungeons & Dragons, which they sometimes acted out with real weapons in the steam tunnels of their college campus while under the influence of drugs and alcohol. However, Kirkus Reviews, in discussing Bledsoe's Blood Games, commented that "the linkage [Bledsoe] attempts to establish between Dungeons & Dragons and the crime seems tenuous." Critics also remarked that both television adaptations displayed Dungeons & Dragons handbooks with artwork altered from the originals, in an apparent effort to imply they had inspired the murder.

The case has also featured in the true crime television documentaries Dark Temptations (2014) and Blood Relatives (2016).

== See also ==
- Dungeons & Dragons controversies
