= Louise Latham =

American actress (1922–2018)

- Latham in 1974
- Born: Johnie Louise Latham; September 23, 1922; Hamilton, Texas, U.S.
- Died: February 12, 2018 (aged 95); Montecito, California, U.S.
- Occupation: Actress
- Years active: 1961–2000
- Spouses: Raymond Archibald Pittman Jr. (m. 1948, divorced); Paul Picard (m. 1968, divorced)

Johnie Louise Latham (September 23, 1922 – February 12, 2018) was an American actress, perhaps best known for her portrayal of Bernice Edgar in Alfred Hitchcock's 1964 film Marnie.

== Background ==
Latham was born on September 23, 1922, in Hamilton, Texas. She came from a long line of ranchers, mostly around San Saba and Mason counties. Latham attended the Hockaday School in Dallas, where one of her classmates was future screenwriter Jay Presson Allen.

== Career ==
=== Television ===
Most of Latham's work was on television. In 1965, she made two appearances on Perry Mason: Matilda Shore in "The Case of the Careless Kitten" and Shirley Logan in "The Case of the Cheating Chancellor".

She made an appearance on The Waltons, playing Olivia's Aunt Kate, who consoles Olivia through her ordeal with menopause. She also appeared in The Alfred Hitchcock Hour, Bonanza, Gunsmoke, Kojak, Hawaii Five-O, Ironside, Columbo, Quincy, M.E., Rhoda, Murder, She Wrote, and The Streets of San Francisco. On Family Affair, she appeared as Aunt Fran, who leaves Buffy (Anissa Jones) in the care of Uncle Bill (Brian Keith) in the show's first episode. On Bonanza in the 1966 episode "A Real Nice, Friendly Little Town", she was Willie Mae Rikeman, and in the 1971 episode "The Silent Killer", she was Mrs. Harriet Clinton). She appeared on Designing Women as Perky, the mother of Julia and Suzanne Sugarbaker, The X-Files, and The Invaders in the 1967 episode "Genesis". Latham's character (Betsy Chandler) was the first to learn the real circumstances of Dr. Richard Kimble's wife's death (Helen) in the final episode of The Fugitive (1967). She was a regular in the cast of the short-lived 1976 CBS series Sara.

=== Film ===
Latham's role in Marnie (1964), her film debut, proved to be a turning point in her career. A newspaper's photo caption in 1965 noted:

A stage actress, Louise now leans to making films because "Marnie changed my life, satisfied my soul," she says, "now I want some more of the same."

She also appeared in such films as Firecreek (1968), Adam at 6 A.M. (1970), White Lightning (1973), The Sugarland Express (1974), Winter Kill (1974), Mass Appeal (1984), The Philadelphia Experiment (1984), Paradise (1991), and Love Field (1992).

=== Stage ===
Latham's Broadway credits include the 1956 revival of Major Barbara, Invitation to a March (1960), and Isle of Children (1962).

Her other stage performances included work "under the personal direction of Margo Jones" in Theater '54 in Dallas, Texas. In 1958, she was in a touring company that performed Cat on a Hot Tin Roof.

== Personal life and death ==
Latham was married twice, first to Raymond Pittman and then to TV producer Paul Picard (both unions ending in divorce). She died on February 12, 2018, at Casa Dorinda, a retirement community in Montecito, California, at the age of 95.

== Filmography ==
=== Film ===
Year	Title	Role	Notes
1964	Marnie	Bernice Edgar	
1967	Johnny Belinda	Mrs. McKee	TV movie
1968	Firecreek	Dulcie	
1969	Hail, Hero!	Miss Mirabel	
1970	Adam at 6 A.M.	Mrs. Hopper	
1971	Making It	Mrs. Wilson	
1971	Sweet, Sweet Rachel	Lillian Piper	TV movie
1971	The Harness	Emma Randall	TV movie
1972	Invitation to a March	Lily Brown	TV movie
1973	Savage	Marian Stern	TV movie
1973	White Lightning	Martha Culpepper	
1973	Dying Room Only	Vi	TV movie
1974	Tell Me Where It Hurts	Louise	TV movie
1974	The Sugarland Express	Mrs. Looby	
1974	Winter Kill	Doris	TV movie
1975	Shell Game	Constance Margolin	TV movie
1975	92 in the Shade	Mrs. Skelton	
1976	Territorial Men	Martha Higgins	TV movie
1976	33 Hours in the Life of God	Nurse Levitt	TV movie
1977	Stonestreet: Who Killed the Centerfold Model?	Mrs. Schroeder	TV movie
1977	The Ghost of Cypress Swamp	Ma Landers	TV movie
1977	In the Matter of Karen Ann Quinlan	Sister Mary Luke	TV movie
1979	Amateur Night at the Dixie Bar and Grill	Fanny	TV movie
1980	The Ghosts of Buxley Hall	Bettina Buxley	TV movie
1981	Thin Ice	Mrs. McCormick	TV movie
1982	Pray TV	Mrs. Oakes	TV movie
1982	Lois Gibbs and the Love Canal	Pat Kinsman	TV movie
1984	The Philadelphia Experiment	Pamela	
1984	Obsessive Love	Mrs. Foster	TV movie
1984	Mass Appeal	Margaret	
1985	Love Lives On	Nana	TV movie
1985	Toughlove	Mrs. Griffin	TV movie, Uncredited
1987	Stillwatch	Lila Thatcher	TV movie
1989	Settle the Score	Helen Whately	TV movie
1991	The Haunted	Mary Smurl	TV movie
1991	Crazy from the Heart	Mae Esther	TV movie
1991	Paradise	Catherine Reston Lee	
1992	Love Field	Mrs. Enright	
1994	In the Best of Families: Marriage, Pride & Madness	Delores Lynch	TV movie
1996	Mary & Tim	Forbsie	TV movie

=== Television ===
Year	Title	Role	Notes
1961	Armstrong Circle Theatre	Faye	Episode: "The Fortune Tellers"
1965	The Doctors and the Nurses	Mrs. Franks	Episode: "Night of the Witch"
1965	The F.B.I.	Mrs. Collier	Episode: "How to Murder an Iron Horse"
1965	Alfred Hitchcock Presents	Maude Isles	Episode: "An Unlocked Window"
1965	The Rogues	Catherine DeMontrachet	Episode: "The Laughing Lady of Luxor"
1965	Mr. Novak	Adele	Episode: "And Then I Wrote"
1965	Perry Mason	Shirley Logan	Episode: "The Case of the Cheating Chancellor"
1965	Ben Casey	Ellen Carter	Episode: "If You Play Your Cards Right, You Too Can Be a Loser"
1966	A Man Called Shenandoah	Cora Eldridge	Episode: "The Death of Matthew Eldridge"
1966	The F.B.I.	Ethel Wallace	Episode: "The Price of Death"
1966	Run for Your Life	Claire Burden	Episode: "The Last Safari"
1966	Bonanza	Willie Mae Rikeman	Episode: "A Real Nice, Friendly Little Town"
1966–1968	Family Affair	Fran Heiger	Recurring role
1967	The Invaders	Joan Corman	Episode: "Genesis"
1967	The Fugitive	Betsy Chandler	Episode: "The Judgment: Part II"
1967	The F.B.I.	Barbara Griswold	Episode: "By Force and Violence"
1968	NET Playhouse		Episode: "Home"
1968	The Outsider	Frances Dustin	Episode: "A Wide Place in the Road"
1968	CBS Playhouse	Mrs. Meridan	Episode: "Saturday Adoption"
1968	Gunsmoke	Polly Cade	Episode: "Waco"
1969	The F.B.I.	Edith Bender	Episode: "The Attorney"
1969	Judd, for the Defense	Claire Beeton	Episode: "Between the Dark and the Daylight"
1969	The Young Lawyers	Maria Cannon	Episode: "The Young Lawyers"
1969	Ironside	Wanda	Episode: "Poole's Paradise"
1969	Gunsmoke	Louise Driscoll	Episode: "The Mark of Cain"
1969	Gunsmoke	Phoebe Clifford	Episode: "Hawk"
1969	Gunsmoke	Emilie Sadler	Episode: "Roots of Fear"
1970	Gunsmoke	Claire Gentry	Episode: "Gentry's Law"
1970	The Name of the Game	Miss Digby	Episode: "The King of Denmark"
1971	The Name of the Game	Helen Bigelow	Episode: "LA 2017"
1971	Bonanza	Mrs. Harriet Clinton	Episode: "The Silent Killer"
1971	Medical Center	Mrs. Whitlock	Episode: "Suspected"
1971	Ironside	Martha Gordon	Episode: "The Priest Killer"
1971	McCloud	Emily Cantrell	Episode: "Encounter with Aries"
1971	Longstreet	Maxine Bailey	Episode: "Spell Legacy Like Death"
1972	Cannon	Mrs. Bolinger	Episode: "A Deadly Quiet Town"
1972	Owen Marshall, Counselor at Law	Frances Fisher	Episode: "A Question of Degree"
1972	The Sixth Sense	Mrs. Bennett	Episode: "Eye of the Haunted"
1972	Hawaii Five-O	Mrs. Klein	Episode: "Pig in a Blanket"
1972	The Streets of San Francisco	Harriet Sensibaugh	Episode: "In the Midst of Strangers"
1972	Young Dr. Kildare	Mrs. Field	Episode: "The Legacy"
1973	Hec Ramsey	Willa Hollister	Episode: "The Mystery of Chalk Hill"
1973	Kojak	Madge Donnelly	Episode: "Requiem for a Cop"
1973	Columbo	Mrs. Norris	Episode: "Double Exposure"
1974	Gunsmoke	Joan Shepherd	Episode: "To Ride a Yeller Horse"
1974	The Wide World of Mystery	Anne	Episode: "The Book of Murder"
1974	Rhoda	Louise Shattner	Episode: "The Lady in Red"
1974	Medical Center	Mrs. Tully	Episode: "Heel of the Tyrant"
1974	Lucas Tanner	Mrs. Gibbons	Episode: "Cheers"
1975	The Six Million Dollar Man	Ms. Hallaway	Episode: "Clark Templeton O'Flaherty"
1976	McNaughton's Daughter	Cassy Garnett	Miniseries
1976	Sara	Martha Higgins	Recurring role
1976	Great Performances	Mrs. Winemiller	Episode: "Eccentricities of a Nightingale"
1976	Good Heavens	Bertha Salnick	Episode: "The Queen's Rook Club"
1977	Visions	Mary Blakemore	Episode: "All I Could See from Where I Stood"
1977	The Waltons	Aunt Kate Grover Daly	2 episodes
1977	Disneyland	Ma Landers	Episode: "The Ghost of Cypress Swamp"
1977–1979	Eight Is Enough	Katherine Mitchell	Recurring role
1978	Quincy, M.E.	Nurse Katherine Lowry	Episode: "Matters of Life and Death"
1978	The Awakening Land	Jary Luckett	Episode: "The Trees"
1979	Backstairs at the White House	Housekeeper Nesbitt	Miniseries
1979	Big Shamus, Little Shamus	Eleanor	Episode: "The Canary"
1980	Scruples	Mary Ann Evans	Miniseries
1980	CHiPs	Lucy Kenton	Episode: "Nightingale"
1980	The Contender	Alma Captor	Miniseries
1980	Family	Elaine Hogan	Episode: "The Ties That Bind"
1980	Disneyland	Bettina Buxley	Episode: "The Ghosts of Buxley Hall"
1986	Highway to Heaven	Mildred Kelsey	Episode: "Close Encounters of the Heavenly Kind"
1986	Dress Gray	Mrs. Loerna Tutwiler	Miniseries
1986	Hotel	Jenny Lucas	Episode: "Double Jeopardy"
1986	Fresno	Ethel Duke	Miniseries
1986	Designing Women	Mrs. Perky Sugarbaker	Episode: "Perky's Visit"
1988	CBS Summer Playhouse	Mrs. Harding	Episode: "My Africa"
1988	Hothouse	Louise Dougherty	Recurring role
1988	Hunter	Emily Hill	Episode: "No Good Deed Ever Goes Unpunished"
1989	Falcon Crest	Irene	Episode: "Ties That Bind"
1991	Roc	Mrs. Hope	Episode: "A Home, a Loan"
1992	Cruel Doubt	Polly Bates	Miniseries
1992	Murder, She Wrote	Mrs. Oates	Episode: "The Classic Murder"
1993	Against the Grain	Hilda	Episode: "A House Is Not a Home"
1995	Earth 2	Old Lydia	Episode: "Natural Born Grendlers"
1996	In Cold Blood	Eunice Hickock	Miniseries
1997	ER	Mrs. Cupertino	Episode: "Faith"
1997	Total Security	Zoe Gareth	Episode: "Wet Side Story"
2000	The X-Files	Marjorie Butters	Episode: "En Ami"
