= Paul Picard =

American film producer

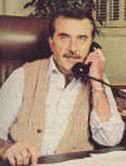

Paul Romeo Picard (July 17, 1930 – October 3, 1994) was an American film producer best known for his role in developing the series The Dukes of Hazzard with Philip Mandelker and creator Gy Waldron.

== Early life and career ==
Paul was born as Paul Romeo Picard 17 July 1930 in Warwick, Rhode Island, to Romeo Joseph Picard and Irene Gertrude Mineau. Paul's father Romeo was a painter in the building industry in Rhode Island. Paul was the grandson of barber Albert Nazaire Picard and his wife Marie Sevigny and Joseph Isaac Mineau and Matilda Josephine Contois. He was the oldest of four children. Paul is of French-Canadian descent. He was a 1949 graduate from De LaSalle Academy, in Newport, Rhode Island, and a former communicant of St. Mark Church, in Jamestown, Rhode Island. Paul served in the Army from 1951 to 1953 as an interpreter in France. His brother was Gérard J Picard, who had Down syndrome and died at The Ladd School in Exeter, Rhode Island in 1971. In Providence, Rhode Island, Paul's mother Irene sued the Ladd School Mental Hospital for $10 million for alleging medical neglect that contributed to Paul's brother's death in 1971. Paul's sisters were Claire Antoinette Picard and Gertrude "Sister Claudine" Picard, who was a nun in the Roman Catholic Church.

After starting as an actor, Picard was the director of daytime programming for ABC, and then moved on to oversee TV shows, including The Lawrence Welk Show, The Hollywood Palace, and the broadcasts of the Emmy Awards and Academy Awards. During his career, he worked at MGM, American International Pictures, and Warner Bros. In addition to Dukes of Hazzard, he oversaw Scruples, California Fever, and The Pirate.

== Death ==
He died at his home in Tuscany, Italy, from pancreatic cancer on October 3, 1994.

== Personal life ==
Paul was first married to Phyllis Carolyn Keune in Cranston, Rhode Island, on May 19, 1951. Then his third marriage was to Louise Latham in Hamilton, Texas, on July 23, 1968.

== Ancestry ==
Paul Romeo Picard is the direct descendant of French pioneer Philippe Destroismasons dit Picard, Sr., and his wife Marie Martine Crosnier. He is also a descendant of Zacharie Cloutier, Jean Guyon, and French explorer Jean Nicolet and Jean's native American spouse Gisis Bahmahmaadjimiwin (Jeanne Nipissing) through their daughter Madeleine Euphrosine Nicolet. He is also a descendant of Pierre de St. Pierre, French pioneer Jean Pelletier, and French pioneer Robert Levesque.
