= Dying Room Only =

1973 television film by Philip Leacock

- Home video cover art
- Genre: Horror; Mystery; Thriller
- Based on: "Dying Room Only" (1953 short story) by Richard Matheson
- Written by: Richard Matheson
- Directed by: Philip Leacock
- Starring: Cloris Leachman; Ross Martin; Ned Beatty; Louise Latham; Dana Elcar; Dabney Coleman
- Music by: Charles Fox
- Country of origin: United States
- Original language: English

Production
- Executive producer: Lee Rich
- Producers: Allen S. Epstein; Neil T. Maffeo
- Production locations: Borrego Springs, California, U.S.
- Cinematography: John M. Stephens
- Editor: Bill Mosher
- Running time: 74 minutes
- Production company: Lorimar Productions

Original release
- Network: ABC
- Release: September 18, 1973

Dying Room Only is a 1973 American made-for-television horror mystery thriller film directed by Philip Leacock and starring Cloris Leachman and Ross Martin. Written by Richard Matheson and based on his 1953 short story of the same name, the film follows a woman whose husband disappears after they stop by a rural diner in the Arizona desert.

Produced by Lorimar Productions, who was also in charge of many television films of the period, Dying Room Only had its world premiere broadcast on ABC as a Tuesday movie of the week on September 18, 1973. It was later released on VHS, and eventually DVD by the Warner Archive Collection.

== Plot ==
Bob Mitchell and his wife Jean are driving through the Arizona desert on their way home to Los Angeles. A detour takes them 100 miles out of the way down a deserted road because Jean insisted on taking photographs of a particular area to take back to their daughter. The couple later stops at the Arroyo Motel, a rundown roadside cafe/inn. Aside from cook Jim Cutler and customer Tom King, the place is empty. To their surprise, both Jim and Tom are hostile to them. Feeling uncomfortable, Jean tries to call home using a payphone, but the line is busy.

Jean goes to the restroom and washes her face. When she returns, Bob is nowhere to be found. She thinks he also went to the bathroom. Minutes pass and still no Bob. Jim and Tom are unhelpful, telling Jean that Bob probably just abandoned her. At Jean's request, Tom agrees to go into the men's room to see if Bob is alright. Tom later emerges, saying that Bob is not there.

Jean goes next door to the motel, where a woman named Vi works the front desk. She is also unfriendly and of no help. Unbeknownst to Jean, hurried calls are made between Vi and Jim. Jean tries to go inside the cafe men's room, but it is locked. Jim opens the door when Jean threatens to call the police. Bob is not there, but she does notice a second door. The cook refuses to open it, and Jean contacts the police. Meanwhile, someone drives off in the Mitchell car and Jean runs out screaming for her husband.

Night falls and the sheriff arrives. However, he does not believe Jean's story. He then sees the door to the men's room is not locked. The other door inside leads to an old storage shed, but there is no trace of Bob. An APB is put out for the car, and Jean plans on staying in the motel until further notice from the sheriff. Despite Jean's plea for him to check out the other rooms, the sheriff does not see any cause to do so.

Later, Vi refuses to place a call to the FBI and Jean cannot reach her home in Los Angeles. A furious Jean has no choice but to search around the motel. She enters the shed behind the men's room. Peeking through the keyhole into the restroom beyond, she spies Tom entering and notices a light bulb illuminate next to her. A third man must have been hiding in the shed when Bob entered the restroom; the bulb must have served as an alert to the kidnapper that it was time to nab Bob, leaving Tom and Jim free to distract her as they carried out their plan.

Jean is then relieved to see the car pull up. But instead of Bob, the driver is a hulking character with a limp. She runs away, and, when Tom comes near her, she whacks him with a stick. She sees Bob bound and gagged, and shuffled into the car and driven away.

The sheriff returns, this time believing her. The two drive through the desert towards an abandoned pump station while Tom follows. According to the sheriff, the man with the limp is Lou McDermott, who recently jumped parole. There have been other disappearances, something the sheriff neglected to reveal earlier. At the gas station, the sheriff shoots Lou dead before being killed by Tom. Jean grabs the steering wheel of the police vehicle and tries to run Tom down, but is caught.

Bob and Jean are taken back to the motel and are kept in Tom's truck until the three perpetrators can figure out what to do. Vi turns on Tom and shoots him. As Vi approaches the truck with gun in hand, Jean lights a flare and blinds her. Jean then grabs the revolver and holds both Vi and Jim at bay until the authorities arrive. Jean then calls her children to say they had a "fine time" on their trip and are coming home as fast as they can.

== Cast ==
- Cloris Leachman as Jean Mitchell
- Ross Martin as Jim Cutler
- Ned Beatty as Thomas King
- Dana Elcar as the Sheriff
- Louise Latham as Vi
- Dabney Coleman as Bob Mitchell
- Ron Feinberg as Lou McDermott

== Production ==
Although set in Arizona, the film was shot on location in Borrego Springs, California, in 1973.

== Release ==
Dying Room Only had its world premiere on ABC as part of the network's Movie of the Week series, airing for the first time on September 18, 1973. Although the film was praised for its acting and cinematography, it did receive feminist criticism for its positioning of Leachman's character as a "helpless woman" who has had her "selfhood stolen" when she loses her husband. In review after its world broadcast, Jack Friedman of The Village Voice criticized the film, saying, "The only frightening aspect of this tale of horror was that its latent hatred (class, regional, sexual) were being spewed all across the country. And the loam out there is rich enough already."

After its premiere in 1973, the film became a staple of late night TV, airing erratically throughout the 1970s and 1980s.

=== Home media ===
It was also released on VHS, and later on DVD in 2010 through the Warner Archive Collection.

== See also ==
- List of American films of 1973
