= California Fever (TV series) =

1979 American TV series

- Created by: Dan Polier Jr.
- Starring: Jimmy McNichol; Marc McClure; Michele Tobin; Lorenzo Lamas; Cosie Costa; Lisa Cori; Rex Smith
- Theme music composer: Alan O'Day
- Opening theme: "California Fever"
- Composers: Harry Betts; Dick Halligan; Don Peake; Artie Butler
- Country of origin: United States
- No. of seasons: 1
- No. of episodes: 10

Production
- Executive producer: Paul Picard
- Producers: Lee Sheldon; Harvey Frand; Joseph Bonaduce
- Running time: 48 minutes
- Production companies: Lou Step Productions; Warner Bros. Television

Original release
- Network: CBS
- Release: September 25 – December 11, 1979

California Fever is an American teen drama series that ran on CBS in 1979. The show featured a group of Los Angeles teenagers living an exotic life of the beach, romance, and music. The series was short-lived, airing only 10 episodes.

Prior to the first episode, the show was to be called We're Cruising.

== Cast ==
- Jimmy McNichol as Vince Butler
- Marc McClure as Ross Whitman
- Michele Tobin as Laurie Newman
- Lorenzo Lamas as Rick
- Cosie Costa as Bobby
- Lisa Cori as Sue

== Episodes ==
No.	Title	Directed by	Written by	Original release date
1	"Underground Jock"	Claudio Guzmán	Stephen Kandel	September 25, 1979
Pilot episode
2	"The Girl from Somewhere"	Bob Claver	Joseph Bonaduce	October 2, 1979
3	"Movin' Out"	Marc Daniels	Dan Polier Jr.	October 9, 1979
4	"Hardrock Rally"	Alan Myerson	Janet Meyers	October 16, 1979
5	"Four on the Floor"	Charles R. Rondeau	Tom Sawyer & Barry Blitzer	October 23, 1979
6	"Portrait of Laurie"	Harvey S. Laidman	Jeri Taylor	October 30, 1979
7	"Centerfold"	Alan Myerson	Jerry Siegel & Ken Rotcop	November 6, 1979
8	"Stars of Tomorrow"	Norman Abbott	Ray Parker	November 13, 1979
9	"The Good Life"	Dennis Donnelly	Lee Sheldon	December 4, 1979
10	"Beach Wars"	Bruce Kessler	Story by : Janet Meyers & Sandra Kay Siegel; Teleplay by : Sandra Kay Siegel	December 11, 1979
