= Blood Games (Bledsoe book) =

1991 novel by Gloria Murphy

- Author: Jerry Bledsoe
- Genre: True crime
- Publisher: Dutton Books
- Publication date: November 1, 1991
- Publication place: United States
- Pages: 464
- ISBN: 0-525-93369-7

Blood Games: A True Account of Family Murder is a true crime non-fiction book written by Jerry Bledsoe and published on November 1, 1991 by Dutton Books. The book recounts the murder of Lieth Von Stein. It was adapted into a television film titled Honor Thy Mother that premiered on CBS on April 26, 1992.
