= Los Peñasquitos Creek Arch Bridge =

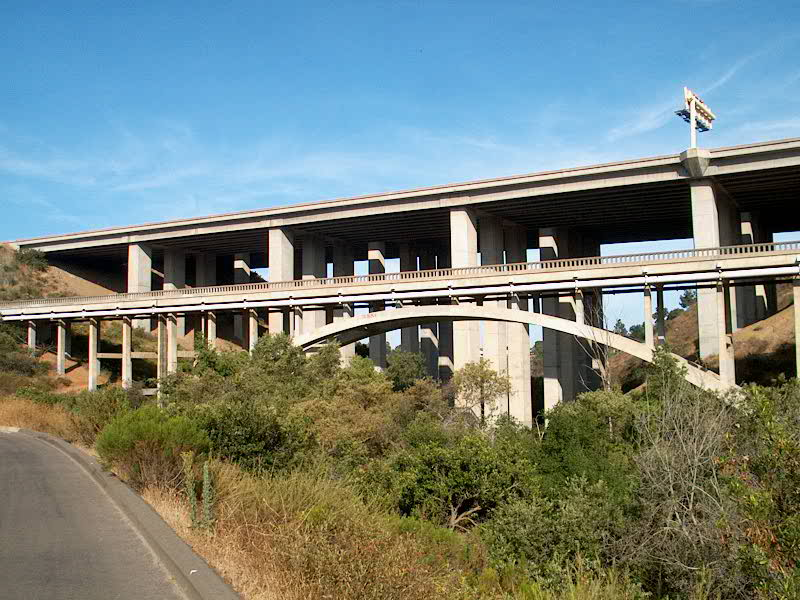
- Original Los Peñasquitos Creek Arch Bridge (foreground) and new I-15 bridge.
- Coordinates: 32°56′39.5″N 117°6′28.2″W
- Locale: San Diego, California, United States
- Official name: Cara Knott Memorial Bridge

Characteristics
- Material: Reinforced concrete
- Total length: 434 feet
- Longest span: 220 feet

History
- Opened: 1949

Location
- Interactive map of Los Peñasquitos Creek Arch Bridge

The Los Peñasquitos Creek Arch Bridge is a pair of road bridges in San Diego, California.

Completed in 1949, the original bridge is a reinforced concrete open-spandrel arch-bridge with an overall length of 434 feet (132 m), and arch span of 220 feet (67 m). It now serves as a service road and bike path.

The new Los Peñasquitos Creek bridge was first built in 1966 as the southbound lanes of the U.S. Route 395 freeway. It was completely replaced by a prestressed concrete girder bridge during the widening of the Interstate 15 freeway in 1976.

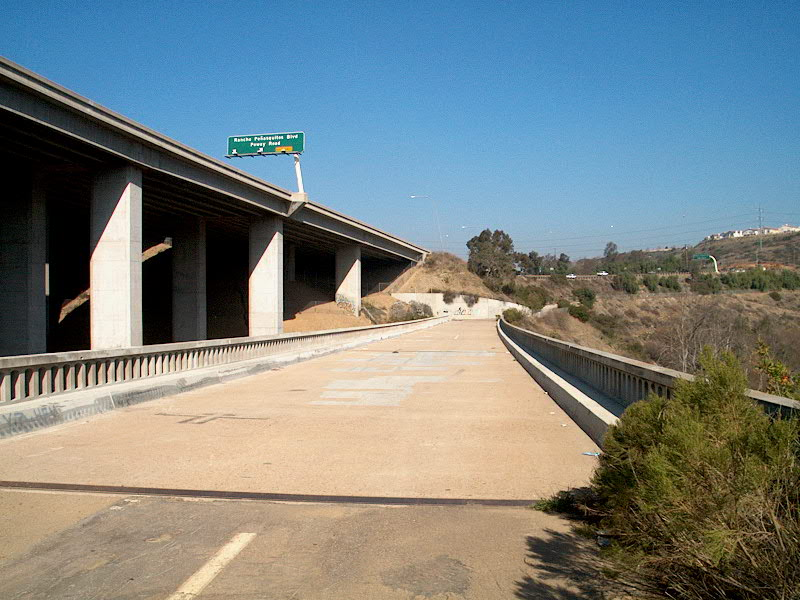
Old Los Peñasquitos Creek Arch Bridge, new bridge on the left.

== Cara Knott Memorial Bridge ==
In 1995, the new bridge was renamed the Cara Knott Memorial Bridge after 20-year-old Cara Knott, a San Diego State University student who was stopped and then subsequently murdered by California Highway Patrol officer Craig Peyer near the bridge on the night of December 27, 1986. Peyer was later convicted in the case and is serving a 25 years-to-life sentence in prison. In 2000, Cara's father, Sam, died of a heart attack, just a few yards from the exact place where his daughter was killed, while taking care of a garden the family built to honor Cara.

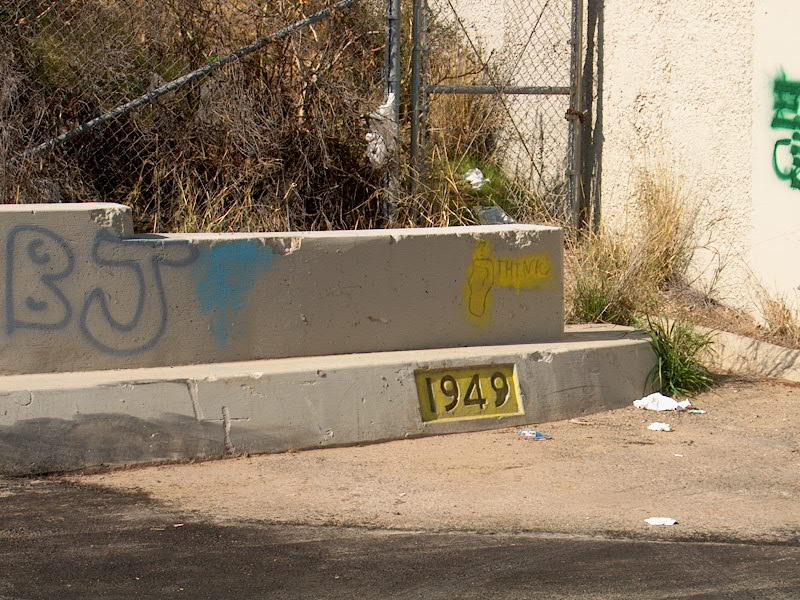
Date on original Los Peñasquitos Creek Arch Bridge.
