= Jerry Bledsoe =

American author and journalist (1941–2025)

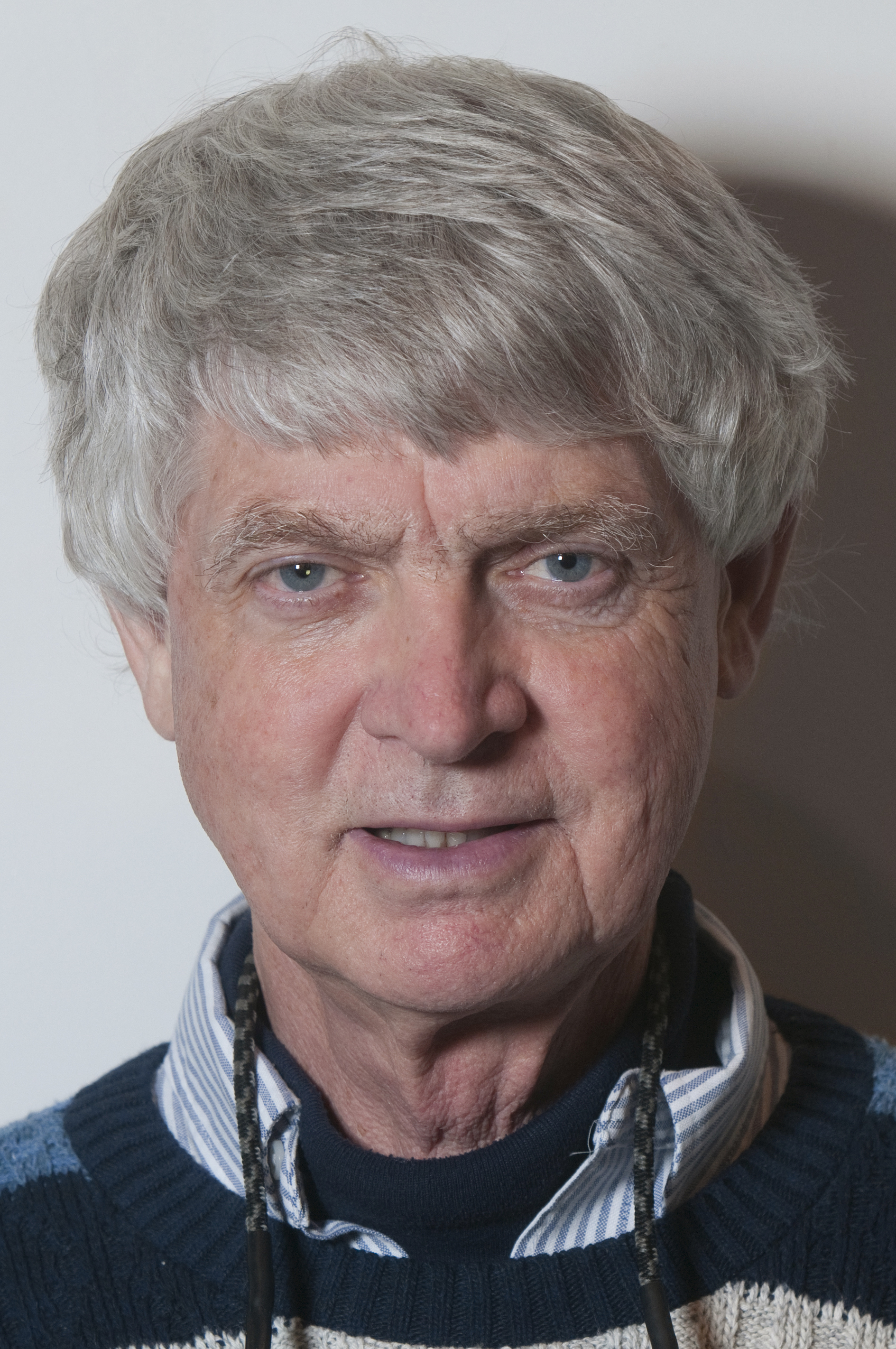
- Born: July 14, 1941; Danville, Virginia, U.S.
- Died: December 31, 2025 (aged 84); Asheboro, North Carolina, U.S.
- Occupations: Author, journalist
- Writing career
- Notable awards: National Journalism Awards – Ernie Pyle Award for Human Interest Writing; 1968; 1970

Jerry Bledsoe (July 14, 1941 – December 31, 2025) was an American author and journalist known for several true crime titles based on murders in his native state of North Carolina.

== Life and career ==
Bledsoe was born in Danville, Virginia, on July 14, 1941. His journalism career, which spanned over 20 years, included newspaper work in the North Carolina cities of Kannapolis, Charlotte, and Greensboro and work at Esquire magazine. Bledsoe also contributed investigative reports to the Rhinoceros Times, including a 92-part, three-year series detailing the controversies surrounding the Greensboro Police Department.

His first published book was the stock car book The World's Number One, Flat-Out, All-Time Great Stock Car Racing Book published by Doubleday in 1975. His book Bitter Blood was #1 on the New York Times bestseller list and was adapted as a television movie. Bledsoe established Down Home Press to publish books about North Carolina.

He and his wife, Linda, lived in Randolph County, North Carolina. Bledsoe died on December 31, 2025, at the age of 84.

== Books ==
- The World's Number One, Flat-Out, All-Time Great Stock Car Racing Book (1975)
- You Can't Live on Radishes (1976)
- Just Folks: Visitin's With Carolina People (1980)
- Where's Mark Twain When We Really Need Him (1981)
- From Whalebone to Hot House: A Journey Along North Carolina's Longest Highway, U.S. 64 (1986)
- Bitter Blood: A True Story of Southern Family Pride, Madness, and Multiple Murder (1989)
- Bare-Bottomed Skier: And Other Unlikely Tales (1990)
- Just Folks: Visitin' With Carolina People (1990)
- North Carolina Curiosities: Jerry Bledsoe's Outlandish Guide to the Dablamedest Things to See and Do in North Carolina (1990)
- Blood Games: A True Account of Family Murder (1991)
- Country Cured: Reflections from the Heart (1991)
- Blue Horizons: Faces and Places from a Bicycle Journey Along the Blue Ridge Parkway (1993)
- Before He Wakes: A True Story of Money, Marriage, Sex and Murder (1994) (About convicted murderer Barbara Stager)
- Grits For Brain (1994)
- The Angel Doll: A Christmas Story (1996)
- Death Sentence: The True Story of Velma Barfield's Life, Crimes, and Execution (1998)
- A Gift of Angels: Sequel to the Angel Doll, a Christmas Story (1999)
- Partial to Home: A Memoir of the Heart (w/Bob Timberlake, 1999)
- Death by Journalism: One Teacher's Fateful Encounter With Political Correctness (2001)
- Built on a Rock: A Memoir of Faith, Family and Place (w/Jerry D. Neal, 2005)
- Fire In The Belly: Building A World-leading High-tech Company From Scratch In Tumultuous Times (w/Jerry D. Neal, 2005)
