= City Confidential =

American documentary television program

- Narrated by: Paul Winfield (1998–2004); Keith David (2004–2005); Mike Colter (2021-2025)
- Country of origin: United States
- No. of seasons: 14
- No. of episodes: 163

Production
- Producer: Jupiter Entertainment
- Running time: 60 minutes

Original release
- Network: A&E
- Release: November 7, 1998 – August 8, 2025

City Confidential is an American documentary television show, originally airing on the A&E Network, that singles out a community during each episode and investigates a crime that has occurred there. Rather than being a straightforward procedural, the installments begin by focusing on the history and spirit of the city chosen. Often, the crime and persons involved highlight a unique feature of that community. Additionally, the show analyzed not only the crime itself, but also the impact that the crime, ensuing investigation and legal proceedings, had had on the community at large.

Part of City Confidential's success was the wide variety of American cities the show covered. The show premiered in 1998 and featured communities that varied in size and prominence, from the smallest village to the largest urban areas. Examples include medium-sized cities such as Newberry, South Carolina; Saddle River, New Jersey; Little Rock, Arkansas; and St. Charles, Missouri; and major cities such as Boston, Massachusetts, New Orleans, Louisiana; Miami, Florida; and Los Angeles, California.

The original narrator of City Confidential, Paul Winfield, was involved from the show's premiere in 1998 until his death in 2004. He was replaced by actor Keith David. The show was produced by Jupiter Entertainment. City Confidential aired the last episode of its original run in December 2005.

On September 27, 2021, A&E announced that the series would be revived, hosted by actor Mike Colter and produced by Propagate, with the first new episode set to air on October 28, 2021.
