= Clarence Elkins =

American wrongfully convicted for murder and rape

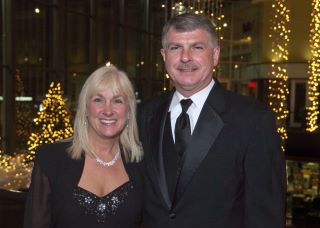
- Clarence and wife Molly Elkins (2012)
- Born: Clarence Arnold Elkins; January 19, 1963 (age 63)
- Known for: Wrongfully convicted of the rape and murder of his mother-in-law; activist against wrongful convictions
- Spouse(s): Melinda Elkins Dawson (m. 1981; div. 2007) Molly Elkins (m. 2010)
- Children: 2

Clarence Arnold Elkins Sr. (born January 19, 1963) is an American man who was wrongfully convicted of the 1998 rape and murder of his mother-in-law, Judith Johnson, and the rape and assault of his wife's niece, Brooke Sutton. He was convicted solely on the basis of the testimony of six-year-old Brooke, who testified that Elkins was the perpetrator.

Brooke later voiced doubts about her identification, claiming that in her initial statement when she said "He looked like uncle Clarence", she simply meant that he reminded her of Elkins as opposed to being a positive identification and that she only identified him in her testimony at the urging of Summit County Prosecutor Maureen O'Connor (Chief Justice of the Ohio Supreme Court until 2022) and the main courtroom prosecutor, Michael Carroll. Brooke recanted her statement and Elkins appealed on that basis, but his appeal was denied.

The family gathered funding to test DNA found at the scene and he was excluded. Once again, his appeal was denied. The judge ruled that because the jury convicted Elkins without the DNA results, it was likely that he would have been convicted even if the DNA did not match.

Elkins' wife, Melinda, conducted her own investigation. She eventually identified Johnson's next door neighbor, Earl Mann, a convicted sex offender, as a likely suspect. Elkins collected a cigarette end from Mann, who was serving time at the same prison, and provided it to his defense attorney for testing.

Mann's DNA from the cigarette end was found to be a match to the DNA found at the crime scene. Elkins was exonerated after serving 6.5 years in prison.

Elkins now works as an advocate to halt wrongful convictions and was instrumental in getting Ohio to pass Senate Bill 77, also known as Ohio's Innocence Protection Act. This bill contains provisions requiring the police to follow best practices for eyewitness identifications, provides incentives for the videotaping of interrogations, and requires that DNA be preserved in homicide and sexual assault cases.

A 2009 documentary was made about the case titled Conviction: The True Story of Clarence Elkins. He was also featured on Crime Watch Daily with Chris Hansen in 2017. Also in 2017, Fox 8 Cleveland covered Elkins' trip to Chicago, where a procedure called "stellate ganglion block" was performed on both him and his wife Molly, by Dr. Eugene Lipov. This procedure was done in order to reduce symptoms of PTSD.

== The attack ==
In the early morning hours of June 7, 1998, Clarence Elkins' mother-in-law, 58-year-old Judy Johnson, and his wife's six-year-old niece, Brooke Sutton, were brutally attacked by an intruder in Johnson's home in Barberton, Ohio.

Johnson had been asleep on her living room couch when she was attacked. She was raped, stabbed, and beaten so severely that her nose, jaw, collarbone and skull were all fractured in the assault. Her cause of death was determined to be strangulation.

Brooke, who was sleeping in her grandmother's bed, was awakened by the noise. She recalls: "I got out of bed and I went to the kitchen and I looked and I seen that there was a guy in the kitchen, but it scared me, so I ran back to the bedroom." She hid under the covers pretending to be asleep.

The intruder entered the bedroom and struck Brooke in the face, knocking her unconscious. She was also beaten, raped, strangled, and suffered a small cut to her throat, but survived without any memory of the attack. She regained consciousness several hours later — around 7:00 a.m.— and telephoned a neighbor, leaving a message on their answering machine:

I'm sorry to tell you this, but my grandma died and I need somebody to get my mom for me. I'm all alone. Somebody killed my grandma. Now please, would you get ahold of me as soon as you can. Bye.

Brooke then walked to a neighbor's house, the home of Earl Mann's common-law-wife Tonia Brasiel, and knocked on the door. Brasiel came to the door, told the nightgown-clad, bruised and bloody child she was cooking breakfast for her children and told her to wait on the porch until she could drive her home, which she did approximately 45 minutes later.

== Investigation ==
When the police questioned Brooke, she said that the killer "looked like Uncle Clarence"— Mrs. Johnson's 35-year-old son-in-law, Clarence Elkins. The police interpreted this to mean Elkins himself was the attacker.

Brasiel also reported to Brooke's mother that Brooke had identified Elkins as the attacker. Years later, Brooke said she had grave doubts about the identification at the time but went along with it. "I just wasn't sure it was Uncle Clarence or not," Brooke said. "But I was too afraid to say anything".

Elkins was arrested on the basis of this identification. She later described the situation on Larry King: "I woke up and I found my grandma dead, I went to a next door neighbor's house and I told her that it looked like my uncle Clarence and it sounded like him. So, she took me home and she told my mom [exactly] that — what I told her — and then everyone just started freaking out. And then my mom and dad called the police and my mom and dad told the police that it was my Uncle Clarence who did it."

When asked how the identification could go so wrong, she replied, "Well, I told people that it looked like him and they just went like it was him. They didn't even listen to what I was saying."

== Trial ==
At trial, the prosecution theorized that Elkins killed his mother-in-law due to frustration because she was meddling in his then-contentious marriage to her daughter, Melinda. The case against Elkins was largely based on the testimony of the 6-year-old eyewitness; however, investigators did not find signs of forced entry, or fingerprints or DNA linking Elkins to the scene.

Hairs recovered from Johnson's body were excluded as having come from either Elkins or Johnson. He insisted he was drinking with friends until about 2:40 a.m. Sunday morning, a timeline that Melinda corroborated. She testified that she saw Clarence return home, and knew he remained there, as she was awake most of the night caring for a sick child.

The attack occurred sometime between 2:30 a.m. and 5:30 a.m.; Johnson's residence is more than an hour away by car. Elkins's alibi was also corroborated by his neighbors and friends.

Based on the testimony of Brooke identifying him as her attacker, he was convicted on June 10, 1999, of murder, attempted aggravated murder, two counts of rape by force or threat of force, and felonious assault, and sentenced to two terms of life-imprisonment. Elkins' case was first overseen by Judge Beth Whitmore, then tried under Judge John Adams in Akron, Ohio. It was the first murder trial over which Judge Adams had presided.

== Further investigation ==
After the conviction, Elkins and his wife Melinda began their own investigation and hired a private investigator, Martin Yant, who had previously assisted with the exonerations of numerous wrongfully convicted defendants.

=== Recantation of statement ===
Three years after the trial, Brooke confessed her uncertainty, stating, "It couldn't have been Clarence. The person that hurt me and mee-maw had brown eyes. And Clarence has blue eyes."

Clarence's attorney interviewed Brooke on camera where she recanted her earlier implication of Elkins. Clarence appealed his conviction with this new evidence, but it was denied as the judge believed Brooke had been coached by relatives after the reconciliation.

=== DNA ===
After the failed appeal, they decided to retest the evidence for DNA. The court ruled that Melinda could have access to DNA recovered from the scene, but she would have to pay the costs of DNA testing.

Melinda raised almost $40,000 on her own before asking the Ohio Innocence Project for assistance. They convinced a laboratory in Texas to test two samples for $25,000, half their normal price. The results excluded Clarence Elkins.

Clarence appealed the conviction again on the basis of the new DNA evidence. The court ruled that because a jury convicted him without DNA evidence, they would have convicted him even if it didn't match.

Summit County Common Court Judge Judy Hunter denied Elkins' motion in July 2005.

After the second failed appeal, the family's further research gained information regarding the next door neighbor, Tonia Brasiel, who had driven Brooke home the morning after the attack. It was discovered that Brasiel's common law husband, Earl Mann, was a convicted sex offender who had been released from prison just two days before the murder, on June 5, 1998.

It had been overlooked that Mann's wife Tonia left Brooke, a severely beaten and bloody 6-year-old in immediate need of medical care, on the porch for more than 30 minutes instead of telephoning 911 immediately.

Melinda determined to sample Mann's DNA, but he was in prison by that time. Coincidentally, Mann was serving his time at Mansfield Correctional facility, the same facility where Clarence was serving his sentence. Clarence Elkins collected a cigarette butt discarded by Mann. He sent the cigarette to his attorney who sent it to a laboratory for testing. It was a match.

== Earl Mann ==
Earl G. Mann was born in Melbourne, Florida, before relocating to Ohio. He had an extensive criminal record for crimes ranging from a racially motivated assault on another man to robberies. During 2002, Mann was convicted of raping three girls, his daughters, all under the age of 10. He had three children with Tonia Brasiel, who lived next door to Judith Johnson. Brooke frequently played with their daughters.

In 2005, after Mann was identified as a suspect, Barberton police officer Gerard Antenucci brought to the attention of the prosecution the existence of a memorandum from 1999, four months before Elkins' trial. Antenucci arrested Mann for an unrelated robbery. During the process of his arrest, a drunk and belligerent Mann asked why he hadn't been arrested for the robbery and murder of Judy Johnson. Per policy, the arresting officer sent a memo to the detectives working the Johnson murder. This statement was never disclosed to the defense.

After Mann was identified, Brasiel admitted during questioning that Mann returned home the early morning hours after the murder with deep scratches on his back. When she questioned him, he claimed he had been with a "wild woman". According to Brasiel, when Brooke knocked on the door following the attack, he became angry and insisted that Brasiel not let her in nor call police. Authorities suspected that Mann killed Johnson and attempted to kill Brooke due to a botched robbery.

Melinda Elkins has stated that she suspects Brasiel may have influenced Brooke's identification of Clarence. Brasiel was the first person to hear the six-year-old's alleged identification of Elkins. Despite Mann's suspicious behavior that morning, Brasiel reported to Brooke's mother, after driving Brooke home, that the child had named Clarence as the attacker. Furthermore, Brasiel testified at Elkins's trial that the child had told her that Clarence was the perpetrator.

== Release and lawsuits ==
Despite the DNA evidence connecting Mann to the murder, the district attorney refused to release Elkins. Elkins's attorney contacted Ohio State Attorney General Jim Petro. Petro personally contacted prosecutor Sherri Bevan Walsh, on several occasions, regarding the case. He similarly discovered that she was not interested in reviewing the case.

Petro then took the unorthodox action of having a press conference, in order to publicly pressure the prosecutor to dismiss the charges. The prosecutors performed more DNA testing of hairs found at the scene, and again, Mann was identified.

On December 15, 2005, the charges against Elkins were dismissed, and he was released from prison.

Clarence Elkins settled with the state of Ohio for US$1.075 million. He later filed a civil suit against the Barberton police for failing to disclose the incriminating statement by Earl Mann during his 1999 arrest.

Barberton police sought to have the case dismissed, but failed. The judge ruled that had Mann's statement to Officer Gerard Antenucci been disclosed to the defense, they most likely would have noticed the proximity of Mann, a convicted felon, to the Johnson residence, as well as the behavior of Tonia Brasiel on the morning after the murder.

Mann's DNA would almost certainly have been tested, and Elkins would almost certainly not have been convicted. Elkins later settled with the Barberton police for $5.25 million.

== Mann's conviction ==
In 2008, ten years after the crimes were committed, in a plea agreement to avoid the death penalty, Mann pleaded guilty to charges of aggravated rape and aggravated murder for the death of Johnson, as well as aggravated rape of Brooke (he was not charged with robbery as the statue of limitation had expired). He was sentenced to a minimum of 55 years in prison, meaning he will not be eligible for parole until age 90 or 91.

== Aftermath ==
=== Reform efforts ===
Melinda Elkins Dawson was instrumental in getting Ohio to pass Senate Bill 262, also known as Post Conviction DNA Law. This bill contains provisions for DNA testing post-conviction, using outcome determinative guidelines. Melinda also serves as chair of the board of directors for "Ohioans to Stop Executions". As a public speaker and victim advocate, she continues to fight for justice and to increase awareness of wrongful convictions.

Clarence Elkins was instrumental in getting Ohio to pass Senate Bill 77, also known as Ohio's Innocence Protection Act. This bill includes provisions requiring the police to follow best practices for eyewitness identifications, provides incentives for the videotaping of interrogations, and requires that DNA be preserved in homicide and sexual assault cases. Elkins spent much time advocating for what has been termed the "national model" of innocence reform bills, and the "most important piece of criminal justice legislation in Ohio in a century".

Clarence also engages in public speaking about his case and wrongful convictions in general at universities and other locations across the United States.

=== Family strain ===
Since the night of the crime, Judy's family has been divided due to the case, with some members certain of his guilt and others of his innocence. Three years after the trial, the family partly reconciled, but was still divided on Clarence's innocence. They only fully reconciled after Clarence's exoneration, but some tension and division remains.

Due to his time in prison, Clarence filed for divorce in September 2006, which was finalized in 2007. Despite this, he and Melinda remain friends to this day.

In an interview with Forensic Files, Melinda said that she and Clarence never blamed her niece Brooke for his imprisonment, but admitted that she hadn't spoken to her or her mother since the trial.

Brooke Sutton has not spoken to Melinda, Clarence or their children since Clarence's trial. In an interview with Forensic Files, she expressed remorse for misidentifying her uncle and for putting him and Melinda in the situation they had. She said that her and her parents' relationship with her aunt and ex-uncle are irreparable, despite Clarence's innocence and Mann's conviction.

=== Philanthropy ===
During 2011, Clarence and his new wife, Molly, established the Clarence Elkins Scholarship at the University of Cincinnati College of Law. This scholarship provides $5,000 annually to the Ohio Innocence Project housed at UC Law School, and includes a scholarship to two students in the Ohio Innocence Project each year.

== In popular culture ==
In 2009, a television documentary about the Elkins case was released, named Conviction: The True Story of Clarence Elkins.

Clarence Elkins case was covered in the "All Butt Certain" episode of Forensic Files.

== See also ==
- List of wrongful convictions in the United States
- David Camm
- Shareef Cousin
- Juan Rivera
