= Wrongful conviction of Juan Rivera =

American man wrongfully convicted three times

Juan Rivera
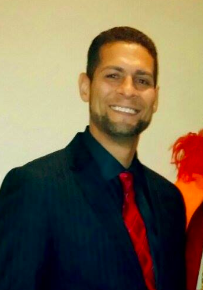
- Juan Rivera
- Born: Juan A. Rivera Jr. October 31, 1972 (age 53); Puerto Rico
- Known for: Being wrongfully convicted three times for the murder of Holly Staker and receiving the largest wrongful conviction settlement in US history
- Criminal penalty: Life imprisonment without parole
- Criminal status: Exonerated

Juan A. Rivera Jr. (born October 31, 1972) is an American man who was wrongfully convicted three times for the 1992 rape and murder of 11-year-old Holly Staker in Waukegan, Illinois. He was convicted twice on the basis of a confession that he said was coerced. No physical evidence linked him to the crime scene. In 2015 he received a $20 million settlement from Lake County, Illinois for wrongful conviction, formerly the largest settlement of its kind in United States history.

DNA testing done in 2004 on semen taken from the crime scene ruled out Rivera as the source. However, the prosecution argued that Staker had been sexually active and the semen sample came from her previous consensual sex with another man. Rivera was convicted a third time. His conviction was overturned by the appellate court. Because the court ruled that there had been insufficient evidence adduced at trial to sustain a conviction, the Double Jeopardy Clause barred prosecutors from retrying Rivera. He was released from prison after serving 20 years.

After his release, Rivera's attorneys asked the courts to order genetic testing on Rivera's shoes. The prosecution had tried to enter these into evidence in 1993. The shoes had Staker's blood on them, but the prosecution withdrew the evidence prior to Rivera's first trial when they learned that the shoes had not been available for sale anywhere in the United States until after the murder.

DNA testing conducted on the shoes in 2014 indicated that the blood belonged to Staker, but it also contained another genetic sample. The DNA in this matched the semen sample from Staker. Rivera's defense team insists that this is proof not only that the blood was planted, but that the real killer's DNA was inadvertently planted as well. The DNA has yet to be matched to an individual, but it has been linked to DNA from the scene of a home invasion and murder in 2000 in Chicago by three men. Only one man of the three has been identified; he was convicted of that crime and is in prison. He claims to have been wrongfully convicted.

Following his exoneration, Rivera sued the city of Waukegan and Lake County; he was awarded $20 million, at its time, the largest wrongful conviction settlement in United States history. This amount included $2 million from John E. Reid & Associates. Rivera was given two polygraph examinations by a Reid employee. He was reported as exhibiting general deception during the examination and subsequently admitted that he did lie to the test question about his alibi, but continued to deny any involvement in the death of Holly Staker. Over the next several days, he was interrogated by law enforcement.

== Murder of Holly Staker ==
On August 17, 1992, police received a call from a woman in Waukegan, Illinois, who reported that the babysitter for her two children, 11-year-old Holly Staker, was missing and the back door to the apartment had been kicked in. Staker's partially clothed body was found on the floor of the children's bedroom. She had been raped, stabbed 27 times, and strangled. Vaginal and anal swabs tested positive for semen.

Evidence technicians took fingerprints and blood samples found in the bedroom and near the kitchen sink, where it appeared someone had washed blood off their hands.

== Investigation ==
On September 29, 1992, police received a tip from a prison inmate that another inmate, Puerto Rican–born Juan Rivera, believed he knew who killed Staker. According to the informant, Rivera told him he was at a party that night near the crime scene and saw a man acting suspiciously.

Rivera was described by the police as friendly and cooperative when he was interviewed and agreed to provide samples of his blood and hair. He told police he was at a party near the crime scene, when another man, whom he identified as Robert Hurley, left the party more than once before later returning sweaty, out of breath, and with a fresh scratch. Further investigation revealed there was no party at the residence on August 17, leading to greater suspicion of Rivera.

Rivera was questioned for many hours over the course of several days and eventually admitted to killing Staker. Following the confession, jail personnel saw Rivera, who had a history of mental illness, beating his head against the wall of his cell. A prison nurse determined that Rivera was in an acute psychotic state and was "not in touch with the reality of what was going on around him". Several hours later, detectives entered the room Rivera was in and had him sign the summary account taken by detectives. Detectives reviewed the statement and agreed that many details given by Rivera were inconsistent with the known facts of the crime; it was decided that two other members of the Task Force would re-interview Rivera to try to clear up these "inconsistencies".

Rivera's mental state had not improved by the time the next interview was to take place, so he was placed in heavy restraints and a prison psychiatrist prescribed Haldol, Cogentin, and Ativan. Rivera signed a rights waiver and the interrogation resumed. A detective told Rivera that "there were a lot of questions concerning facts" in his previous statement and that "he wanted to give Mr. Rivera an opportunity to tell the truth on some of those issues". During this interview, detectives suggested details such as, "She had a multi-colored shirt on, right, Juan?" He had previously misidentified her clothing. The confession that was eventually settled on was closer to the known facts about the crime, but still contained a number of inconsistencies with the crime scene.

No physical evidence was found linking him to the crime, and the fingerprints taken from the crime scene did not match Rivera. At the time of the crime, Rivera was wearing an electronic monitor from a previous conviction. Electronic monitoring system records showed that Rivera did not leave his home on August 17, 1992. Phone records also showed a call from Rivera's home to a relative in Puerto Rico that evening.

== Trials ==
Rivera was charged with first-degree murder on the basis of his confession. He was convicted in November 1993. In 1996, an appeals court reversed the verdict because of several errors, such as the judge allowing hearsay evidence and limiting the defense's opening statement.

Rivera's second trial took place in 1998. Taylor Arena, the child whom Staker had been babysitting, testified at this trial. Arena, who was 2 years old at the time of Staker's murder and 8 at the time of the retrial, testified that she remembered the events of the evening and identified Rivera as the man who had attacked Staker. After four days of deliberation, the jury acquitted him of the first-degree murder charge, but convicted him on three other murder counts. He was sentenced to life imprisonment without parole. In 2001, his conviction was upheld by an appeals court.

== DNA testing ==
In 2004, Rivera filed a motion to test the DNA from the vaginal swabs taken from the crime scene. The motion was granted and DNA testing excluded Rivera as the source of the semen sample. In 2006, Rivera's conviction was vacated a second time.

Despite the DNA evidence, prosecutors made the controversial decision to retry the case. They argued that Staker may have been sexually active or that lab technicians mishandled the DNA. Defense experts noted that if Staker had intercourse prior to the fatal attack, semen would have been found on her underwear. Tests on her undergarments were negative for sperm. Her twin sister denied that Holly was sexually active.

On April 13, 2009, Rivera's third jury trial began. On May 8, the jury found Rivera guilty and he was sentenced to life in prison for the third time.

== Conviction overturned ==
In December 2011, Rivera's conviction was overturned a third and final time. Rivera was released from prison on January 6, 2012 after Lake County state's attorney Michael Waller announced he wouldn't attempt to appeal the ruling. The appellate court criticized the confession, noting the complete absence of any information that was not previously known to members of the investigation team. Each time Rivera gave information that was not already known, the information proved to be false. For example, Rivera claimed to have burned his clothing in a specific dumpster; there was no evidence of a previous fire in that dumpster. He also told investigators that there was another child at the scene — a boy — when there was only a 2-year-old girl. The only details Rivera was able to give investigators that could be corroborated were details that were already known to them.

The appellate court criticized the prosecution for dismissing the DNA evidence. The prosecution presented two possible theories as to how the DNA could eliminate Rivera: contamination and previous sex with another man. Regarding the contamination theory, where the prosecution speculated that no sperm was recovered from the autopsy, but someone else's sperm came in contact with the swab sometime later, the courts dismissed it as "highly improbable".

The courts similarly dismissed the theory that the victim was sexually active. The evidence presented by the prosecution to support Staker's being sexually active was evidence concerning an incident when she was molested at the age of 8 and an incident of masturbation, and extensive testimony about a pair of red lace panties that she owned. The defense argued that this evidence should never have been introduced because it violated the rape shield law. Typically, this law is invoked by prosecutors to limit the argument by the defense that the victim is the "type of person" who is more likely to engage in sexual activity; however, the law also bars prosecutors from presenting the same type of evidence.

Regarding the State's theories on why the DNA did not match, the court wrote:

The State's theories distort to an absurd degree the real and undisputed testimony that the sperm was deposited shortly before the victim died. Simply put, the State's rationalizations of how the DNA from "Unidentified Male #1" came to be found in the victim's body and why none of the defendant's DNA appeared in or around the victim or anywhere at the crime scene cannot save a conviction obtained on a theory of a violent sexual assault and murder. The State did not present any evidence that the victim was in a relationship with anyone. The most reasonable explanation, therefore, of who murdered the victim is not the defendant but rather someone who, unfortunately, has not yet been identified.

The trial judge was also criticized for precluding the defense from presenting multiple pieces of exculpatory evidence, including testimony from experts regarding false confessions. Several risk factors were present in this case, including a history of mental illness, his mental state during the interrogation, and multiple interrogation techniques that are known to increase the likelihood of a false confession. The jury was also led to believe that Rivera failed a polygraph test. The defense was precluded from telling the jury the actual results, which were inconclusive.

Following the reversal, the appellate court took the extraordinary step of barring prosecutors from retrying the defendant.

=== Knife ===
In 2014, former Waukegan police chief Dan Greathouse, who is handling the re-investigation of the Staker case, told Rivera's attorneys that a knife had been found a decade before near the crime scene. In 1994, a neighbor uprooted a bush between his house and the murder scene and found a serrated knife. Rivera's attorneys were not notified about the existence of the weapon, and the police destroyed it without any testing. In the original investigation, police found a broken, straight-edged knife in a nearby yard. No physical evidence connected that weapon to the crime, but prosecutors argued that it was the murder weapon. Rivera confessed that he had broken the knife during the crime and then discarded it.

According to Russell Ainsworth, one of Rivera's lawyers:

The knife is hugely important. It's the potential murder weapon in the case. It could have had the real killer's DNA on it, and it could exclude without any doubt the notion that Juan Rivera had anything to do with this case. To destroy evidence without giving the defense the chance to test it goes against any sense of fairness and justice.

Rivera's lawyers said that a forensic expert they consulted ruled that Staker's wounds point to a knife with a serrated blade rather than a straight edge.

=== Shoes ===
After Rivera's conviction was overturned, his attorney sought to conduct further genetic testing on a piece of evidence that prosecutors attempted to introduce at his trial in 1993: a pair of shoes owned by Rivera that were found to have Staker's blood on them. The police collected the shoes a few weeks after Rivera's arrest from a fellow inmate; Rivera had traded his shoes to the man in exchange for a television set.

Prosecutors announced that they would introduce this critical piece of evidence — the only physical evidence linking Rivera to the crime. An investigation by the defense revealed that the Voit sneakers, made in Hong Kong, were not available for purchase in the United States until sometime after the murder. The defense took the further step of contacting the Walmart store where the shoes had been purchased and obtained proof that Rivera's purchase took place after the murder. Prosecutors withdrew the evidence.

In 2015, a federal judge ordered DNA testing to investigate the allegations of evidence tampering. The results showed that the blood on the shoes belonged to Staker, and that it contained a second genetic profile — one that matched the semen sample taken from the crime scene. "The only realistic inference from the foregoing evidence is that someone endeavored to plant Holly Staker's blood on Mr. Rivera's Voit shoes and in doing so inadvertently planted both her blood there and the blood of the as-yet unidentified killer", said Rivera's attorney.

== Murder of Delwin Foxworth ==
In 2014 when DNA testing was conducted on evidence from the Staker crime scene, a match was found with DNA taken from evidence in the murder in 2000 of a North Chicago, Illinois man. Thirty-nine-year-old Delwin Foxworth was reportedly attacked by three burglars in his North Chicago home in January 2000. He was held at gunpoint and tied up before being beaten with a board, doused with gasoline, and set on fire. He was able to extinguish the flames and seek help, but he later died in August 2002 as a result of his injuries.

Foxworth's girlfriend, who had witnessed the attack, identified Marvin Tyrone Williford as the killer. Williford was tried largely on that eyewitness testimony; he never confessed and no physical evidence linked him to the crime.

Williford was convicted of the murder of Foxworth and is serving an 80-year sentence. His DNA was excluded from that found in a blood sample on the board used in the Foxworth attack. Williford's attorneys insist that the DNA from the Staker crime scene, which matches that in blood from the board used to beat Foxworth, proves that Williford is innocent of the latter attack. The two other suspects in the Foxworth case have not been identified.

"While Mr. Rivera fought to clear his name and officials fought to keep him in prison, the man who really committed the crime was free to commit this additional crime", said Steven Art, one of Rivera's attorneys. "It's the antithesis of good policing in our society. The community suffers as well". The DNA profile has been entered into criminal databases, but has not yet been identified.

== Settlement ==
After serving 20 years in prison, Rivera filed a federal civil rights case against officials of the city of Waukegan and Lake County for wrongful conviction. In 2015, he received a $20 million settlement, at the time the largest-ever settlement for a wrongful conviction in U.S. history.

City attorney Steve Martin told the city council that the city's portion, $7.5 million, was

the best economic decision the city could make in this case. We all agreed that this was an excellent settlement for the city of Waukegan. I understand it's a lot of money, but considering the downside that could have occurred in a courtroom with the case, it was felt economically, it would be extremely beneficial to the city to pay out that amount of money.

The settlement included a payment of $2 million from John E. Reid & Associates, who are known for the Reid technique. Rivera was taken to Reid headquarters in Chicago twice for polygraph tests; the results from the first test were inconclusive, but on the second test Rivera was reported as exhibiting general deception and subsequently admitted that he did lie to the test question about his alibi, but continued to deny any involvement in the death of Holly Staker. Over the next several days he was interrogated by law enforcement.

== See also ==
- List of wrongful convictions in the United States
- Innocence Project
- David Camm
- Shareef Cousin
- Clarence Elkins
