= Bill Clutter =

American wrongful conviction advocate

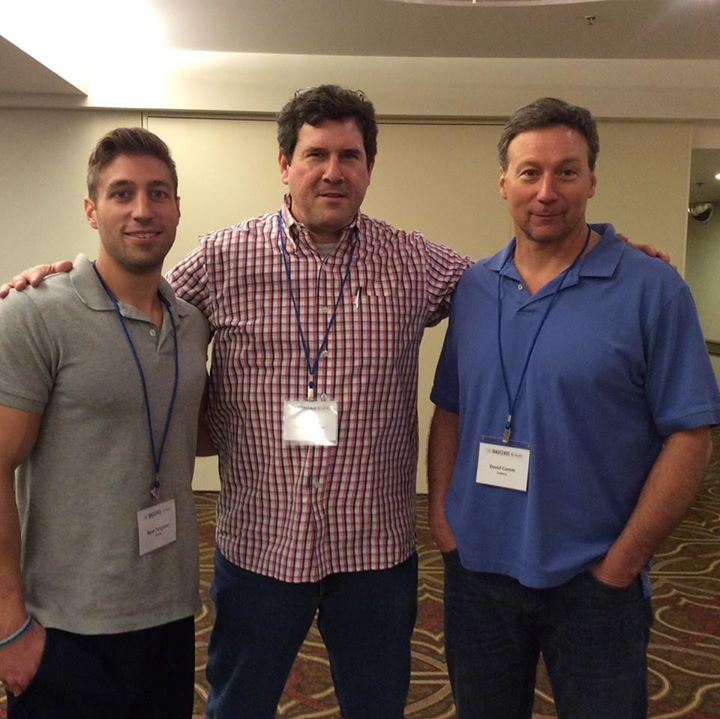
Clutter with two exonerees in 2014. Left to right: Ryan W. Ferguson, Bill Clutter, David Camm

Bill Clutter is an American private investigator, wrongful conviction advocate, and author. He is the co-founder of the Illinois Innocence Project and founder of the national wrongful conviction organization Investigating Innocence. His work on the Donaldson v. Central Illinois Public Service Company case led him to write the book Coal Tar: How Corrupt Politics and Corporate Greed Are Killing America's Children, which is the story of an epidemic of neuroblastoma in Taylorville, Illinois, caused by exposure to coal tar.

== Work as a private investigator ==
Voting Rights Act Lawsuit

In 1985, while working as an investigator for a law firm in Springfield, Illinois, Clutter worked on the McNeil v. City of Springfield lawsuit. The African American plaintiffs his firm represented sued the city of Springfield, claiming the structure of government in Springfield violated the voting rights act of 1965 and diluted voting power of African Americans. The city was previously run by commissioners, and although African Americans had run for office, they were never selected. The case made it to the Illinois Supreme Court and the historic decision changed the city's government from city commission to aldermanic. Following the decision, ward lines were drawn up and aldermen were voted into their seats based on residents living in their district. In 1987, Clutter was elected to the Springfield city council along with the lead plaintiff in the lawsuit, Frank MacNeil.

Donaldson v. Central Illinois Public Service Company

In 1990, Clutter began investigating an epidemic of a rare childhood cancer called neuroblastoma in Taylorville, IL after his law firm was hired to represent four families whose children had been diagnosed. Statistically, a case of neuroblastoma occurs one time every 29 years in a community the size of Taylorville. Four patients in Taylorville were diagnosed between March, 1989 and August, 1991. The cases were eventually linked to a local plant that was owned and operated by the Central Illinois Public Service Company until 1932. The land was later sold, but due to legislation enacted in 1980, CIPS was now responsible for the cleanup of coal tar that was stored in underground tanks. CIPS did not disclose the existence of the tanks either during the sale or following the legislation. Their inaction set in motion of series of events that led to the contamination of groundwater with known carcinogens. The case ended with a $3.2 million dollar jury verdict for the victims.

== Wrongful conviction advocacy ==
Illinois Innocence Project

In 2001, Clutter co-founded the Illinois Innocence Project at the University of Illinois at Springfield. Clutter co-taught the university's first class on wrongful convictions. He co-wrote the Bloodworth Grant the awarded $687 thousand to establish a post-conviction program in Illinois to prove actual innocence. The Kirk Bloodsworth Post-Conviction DNA Testing Program gives grants to states to defray the costs associated with post-conviction DNA testing of forcible rape, murder, and non-negligent manslaughter cases in which actual innocence might be demonstrated. Program funds may also be used to review such post-conviction cases and to locate and analyze biological evidence associated with these cases. Clutter's work in criminal justice reform was credited when the governor signed the legislation to abolish the death penalty in Illinois.

Investigating Innocence

In 2013, Clutter founded a national organization of private investigators called Investigating Innocence. The organization is a non-profit wrongful conviction agency designed to assist nationwide Innocence Project groups in investigating innocence claims.

Conviction Integrity Unit advocacy

Beginning in 2019, Investigating Innocence heavily advocated for the institution of a Conviction Integrity Unit in Illinois. Conviction integrity units, which investigate innocence claims, have popped up in recent years in major metropolitan areas such as Dallas, New York, and Chicago. As government organizations, these groups have a greater ability to access evidence and assist defendants than independent innocence organizations. Illinois has a conviction integrity unit, which has seen over 70 convictions overturned since 2017, but it serves only the Chicago area and smaller counties lack funding for such units. "It would be a financial burden for this office to have a truly independent staff of at least one investigator and one attorney to review the claims, and there are not enough claims like this in a county like Sangamon to warrant those resources," Clutter said. "But on a state level, it makes sense to have it housed in the attorney general's office." In November of 2024, Attorney General Kwame Raoul announced the establishment of the state's first ever Conviction Integrity Unit within the Attorney General's office. “Over the past five years, we have worked with state’s attorneys, appellate justices, the Department of Justice and others to establish a unit within my office that would solely focus on reviewing wrongful convictions, seeking relief when warranted and preventing the devastation caused when someone is wrongfully convicted,” Raoul said. “Wrongful convictions destroy lives, diminish faith in our criminal justice system, and put victims and the general public at risk, as true perpetrators of crimes are able to escape punishment. As a career prosecutor and the state’s top law enforcement official, I look forward to the critical work this unit will do in collaboration with state’s attorneys and stakeholders across the state to ensure integrity in convictions.”

== Exonerations ==
Herb Witlock and Randy Steidl

Clutter conducted the post-conviction investigation that helped free Randy Steidl from death row and Herb Whitlock from life in prison. On July 6, 1986, Karen and Dyke Rhoads were stabbed to death in their bedroom and the house was set on fire. Their arrests and convictions were based on testimony from Deborah Reinbolt and Darrell Herrington, who both separately claimed to be at the crime scene despite the fact that their testimonies didn't include seeing each other at the crime scene. Whitlock was sentenced to life in prison while Steidl was sentenced to death. It was later determined that the defense failed to call witnesses who could have cast doubt on the stories of the witnesses. One witness's boss claimed he was at work on the night of the murders and couldn't have been at the crime scene. The other witness's story was contradicted by the memory of one of their friends. Additionally, experts testified that the knife one of the witnesses provided investigators was too short and her story of a lamp from the home was the murder weapon was determined to be false; the lamp was broken by firefighters after the attack. Steidl was released in 2003, and the prosecution dismissed all charges the following year. Whitlock was released in 2008.

Keith Harris

Keith Harris was the first inmate helped by the Illinois Innocence Project. He was wrongly convicted of a 1979 gas station robbery and the attempted murder of the attendant on the basis of a false identification in a lineup. Authorities failed to disclose the fact that this robbery was just one in a long series of similar robberies and that ballistics tests showed that the six victims who died all had been shot with the same weapon Harris is accused of using. Harris had an alibi at the time of the other robberies and four additional murders occurred after he was arrested. In addition, two other men confessed to all of the murders, including the robbery Harris was accused of. Harris was not aware of the confessions until two decades later when the Illinois Innocence Project took on the case. By the time he was released, he served 22 years of his 50 year sentence for armed robbery and attempted murder. In 2003, Governor Ryan granted a petition filed by the Illinois Innocence Project and granted Harris a full pardon based on actual innocence. “The Harris case illustrates the far-reaching problems in the investigation, arrest, trial, and appeal of cases in Illinois involving serious crimes-- even cases like this that do not involve the death penalty. Keith Harris' case particularly illustrates the problem of eyewitness misidentification," said Clutter.

Rolando Cruz and Alejandro Hernandez

Clutter’s pre-trial investigation also helped free Rolando Cruz and Alejandro Hernandez from death row in Illinois. Ten-year-old Jeanine Nicarico disappeared from her home on February 23, 1983, in Naperville, Illinois. She was found two days later and had been raped and murdered. Rolando Cruz, Alejandro Hernandez, and Stephen Buckley were arrested for the murder on the basis of a coerced confession by Cruz. Although the case was shaky, the prosecution wanted to move forward, causing the lead detective on the case, John Sam, to resign in protest because he believed they were innocent. Buckley's trial ended in a hung jury and the charges were later dropped, but Cruz and Hernandez were sentenced to death.

In 1992, DNA from the crime scene was tested and it excluded Cruz and Hernandez. It was also determined that a police lieutenant made false statements regarding the confession by Cruz. The DNA was later linked to a serial killer named Brian Dugan. He confessed that he alone had committed the murder. He was sentenced to death, but that sentence was commuted to life after the death penalty was abolished in Illinois.

David Camm

Through his work with Investigating Innocence, Clutter helped free David Camm. Camm is a former Indiana state trooper who was wrongfully convicted of the murders of his wife and two children in the garage of their home in September, 2000. Approximately five years after he was arrested, DNA evidence identified a convicted felon named Charles Boney as having been at the crime scene. The DNA evidence was found prior to the first trial, but the state failed to run the DNA through CODIS despite telling the defense that it had been and no matches were found. Camm was tried three times for the murders, with the prosecution arguing that Camm and Boney were co-conspirators in second and third trial. He was acquitted at his third trial. Boney is currently serving 225 years for the murders.

Curt Lovelace

In 2017, Investigating Innocence was also instrumental in the defense of Curtis Lovelace, a former prosecutor who was charged with murder in Quincy, Illinois, in the death of his first wife Cory Lovelace. The organization referred the case to the Exoneration Project, based at the University of Chicago, which agreed to represent Lovelace pro bono. Lovelace was indicted eight years after his wife's death. Investigating Innocence helped develop key evidence that contributed to his exoneration. It was determined that actual cause of death was liver failure. In 1990, Lovelace was team captain of the Fighting Illini football team that won the Citrus Bowl. On a change of venue, a Springfield, Illinois jury took less than two hours to acquit Lovelace on March 10, 2017.

Rodney Lincoln

Investigating Innocence conducted the investigation that linked serial killer Tommy Lynn Sells to the April 27, 1982 murder of JoAnne Tate in St. Louis for which Rodney Lincoln was wrongfully convicted. The investigation of Bill Clutter was featured on Crime Watch Daily, which triggered the recantation of Melissa DeBoer who was seven-years-old and left for dead when she witnessed the murder of her mother. Melissa’s mistaken identification of Rodney Lincoln led to his conviction in 1983. This new evidence persuaded Missouri Governor Eric Greitens to commute Rodney Lincoln’s sentence. On June 3, 2018, Lincoln was freed from prison.

Julie Rea

Clutter's investigation contributed to the release of Julie Rea from prison, who was convicted of the October 13, 1997 murder of her 10-year-old son, Joel. Rea told police that an intruder wearing a ski mask broke into their home and stabbed Joel. Facing the death penalty, Clutter was contacted in June 2000 by Rea’s defense attorney prior to Rea’s indictment by a special prosecutor and suggested serial killer Tommy Lynn Sells fit her client’s description of the assailant. To avoid the reforms that provided resources to indigent defendants like Rea, prosecutors announced they would not be seeking death, which deprived Rea of the Capital Litigation Trust Fund. The prosecution's case centered around the testimony of two bloodstain pattern spatter analysts who argued that a small stain of Joel's blood on Rea's clothing pointed to her as the assailant. The defense argued that they were transfer stains from struggling with the intruder. She was convicted of murder and sentenced to 65 years in prison. About a year after Rea's conviction, true crime author Diane Fanning published the book Through the Window about serial killer Tommy Lynn Sells. In his interviews with Fanning, Sells confessed to a murder that sounded strikingly similar to Joel's murder. An investigation by Clutter confirmed that the confession was genuine, convincing Texas Ranger John Allen to sign an affidavit in support of a petition for a new trial that was filed by the Center on Wrongful Convictions based at Northwestern Law School in Chicago. Rea was granted a retrial and acquitted on the basis of the new evidence.

== Current cases ==
Thomas McMillen

As of 2019, the group is advocating for Tom McMillen, who was convicted and sentenced to life in prison for the 1989 murder of Melissa Koontz. Clutter says that two key witnesses were never called to testify in the case. Their testimony would have contradicted key testimony against McMillen.

Christopher Vaughn

As of 2020, Clutter is advocating for Christopher Vaughn. Vaughn is serving four life sentences after being convicted of the murders of his wife, Kimberly and their three children on June 14, 2007. All four members of the Vaughn family were shot while on their way to a Springfield, IL waterpark. Christopher suffered minor gunshot wounds to his wrist and leg, while the rest of his family sustained fatal wounds. The prosecution argued at trial that Vaughn killed his family; his defense team insisted that Kimberly was the shooter. According to the defense, state police Sgt. Robert Deel said in a deposition that he had evidence indicating that Kimberly Vaughn fired the gun. He believed that she had fired at her husband’s head, but the bullet was deflected by his watch. "I wasn't being listened to by them," Deel said in interview, "In fact, every time that I offered up something that was contrary to what they said, they had some reason why I didn't know what I was talking about, and basically it all fell back on that Christopher Vaughn is a criminal mastermind and he knows all about crime scenes and that he would be able to fool me into thinking that something else happened." Kimberly was also taking medication that could have increased her risk for suicidal thoughts.

== Media ==
David Camm's exoneration and Clutter's work on the case was featured on the Oxygen TV show Framed By the Killer.

Clutter's work on the Christopher Vaughn case was featured on a 12-part podcast by I Heart Radio called Murder in Illinois.
