= Coal Tar: How Corrupt Politics and Corporate Greed Are Killing America's Children =

2018 book by Bill Clutter

- Author: Bill Clutter
- Publication date: October 2018
- ISBN: 9781732693005

Coal Tar: How Corrupt Politics and Corporate Greed Are Killing America's Children is a 2018 book by private investigator and wrongful conviction advocate Bill Clutter. The book details Clutters investigation into an epidemic of a rare childhood cancer called neuroblastoma in Taylorville, Illinois on behalf of his law firm. In the process, Clutter discovers that the epidemic's victims live on land formerly used by the Central Illinois Public Service Company (CIPS) to manufacture of various coal products. CIPS had subsequently sold the land, but remained legally responsible for industrial wastes present; it attempted to escape legal liability by keeping the presence of those wastes a secret. The book details the downstream consequences of CIPS' secrecy, and Clutter's attempt to hold the company to account.

== Neuroblastoma epidemic ==
Between March 1989 and August 1991, four patients in Taylorville, Illinois, were diagnosed with neuroblastoma. Statistically speaking, approximately 9 patients out of every million births will be diagnosed with neuroblastoma. In a town the size of Taylorville, one case of neuroblastoma should occur approximately once in 29 years. During this two-year period, three infants and one teenager were diagnosed. At the time of trial, two patients were in remission, one patient had died, and one patient was paralyzed from the waist down due to complications from his diagnosis. The cases were eventually linked to exposure to coal tar that was stored in underground tanks at a local plant.

== Central Illinois Public Service ==
The site that the coal tar was found on changed hands several times in the past century but was at one time owned by Central Illinois Public Service. Prior to the widespread use of natural gas, the county relied on coal for heat and electric. The plant in Taylorville was constructed in 1892. It was sold to Central Illinois Public Service in 1912 and was decommissioned in 1939. During their operation, the company stored coal tar in underground tanks. The tar was often sold for use as roofing tar among other uses. When the plant was shut down, they dismantled the above-ground structures and sold the land, but failed to disclose the underground tanks, which contained about 50,000 gallons of coal tar.

In 1980, Congress passed the Comprehensive Environmental Response Compensation and Liability Act, which required that all companies notify the EPA of any hazardous waste facilities they had owned and operated and retroactively assigned liability for the disposal of hazardous waste. Under this law, CIPS was legally required to notify the EPA about the underground tanks and was responsible for their proper disposal. Internal documents showed that CIPS made the decision not to disclose the presence of the tanks. The carcinogenic nature of coal tar gained publicity in the early 1980s, a fact that was known to CIPS. CIPS conducted an independent on-site investigation of the risks of carcinogens at each of its abandoned gas-manufacturing sites, including the site in Taylorville. They forwarded the results of their study to their insurance company and applied for insurance to cover potential claims, but did not notify any government agency or the current owner. In 1985, the tanks were disturbed by the site's new owners, Apple Contractors, who had no knowledge of their existence, leading to the release of carcinogens.

CIPS did eventually begin monitoring and cleanup of the site, but as alleged in the lawsuit, they attempted to keep data collection to a minimum and hid data they had already collected in an attempt to minimize liability.

In the first three months of excavations, an air-monitoring station reported seven days with emissions above National Air Quality Standards (NAAQS). On February 8, 1987, a security guard for the site reported that dust blew "all over". Two days later, an air-monitoring station reported a NAAQS exceedance, and a local resident was hospitalized with an intense headache, nausea, blurred vision, and convulsions from a toxic cause. CIPS was advised of the incident but took no action. On February 11, 1987, the project manager for the excavation “wanted to be on record as pushing for shutdown and resident relocation", citing "great concern" over air emissions. During this time frame, truck drivers removing the excavated material complained of nausea. CIPS advised the drivers to wear respirators but made no attempt to relocate or warn the nearby residents. The jury ruled in favor of the families and returned a $3.2 million verdict.
