= Kirk Bloodsworth =

American wrongfully convicted of murder

- Born: October 31, 1960 (age 65)
- Occupation: Waterman
- Known for: First American sentenced to death to be exonerated post-conviction by DNA testing

Kirk Noble Bloodsworth (born October 31, 1960) is a former Maryland waterman and the first American sentenced to death to be exonerated post-conviction by DNA testing.

He had been wrongfully convicted in 1985 of the 1984 rape and first-degree murder of a nine-year-old girl in Rosedale, Maryland. By the time an appeal based on the DNA evidence was underway, his sentence had been commuted to two consecutive life sentences. He gained release from prison and a full exoneration in 1993.

== Wrongful conviction and sentence to death ==
Bloodsworth served in the US Marines, and was honorably discharged at the end of his term. He lived in coastal Maryland, where he worked as a waterman, harvesting shellfish and fish. In 1985 he was wrongfully convicted of sexual assault, rape, and first degree murder in the 1984 case of Dawn Hamilton, a nine-year-old girl in Rosedale, Maryland. Five eyewitnesses stated that he had been with the victim, but he continued to maintain his innocence during his trial and subsequent incarceration. Two of the witnesses had not been able to identify Bloodsworth during the lineup but in fact saw him on television after the crime was committed.

In 1992, while in jail, Bloodsworth read an account of how DNA testing had led to the conviction, in England, of Colin Pitchfork in the killings of Dawn Ashworth and Lynda Mann. This resulted in the use of DNA to gain the exoneration of an earlier suspect in the case, who had falsely confessed to Ashworth's murder. Hoping to prove his innocence, Bloodsworth pushed to have the biological evidence against him tested by this new forensic technique.

Initially, the available evidence in the case — traces of semen in the victim's underwear — was thought to have been destroyed; however, it was eventually located in a paper bag in the judge's chambers. Testing proved that the semen did not match Bloodsworth's DNA profile. In 1993 Bloodsworth was released after more than nine years in prison.

In 1993, the Maryland Governor, William Donald Schaefer, granted Bloodsworth a full pardon. In 2003, nearly a decade after Bloodsworth's release, prisoner DNA evidence added to state and federal databases resulted in a match to the real killer, Kimberly Shay Ruffner. A month after the 1984 murder, Ruffner had been sentenced to 45 years for an unrelated burglary, attempted rape, and assault with intent to murder. He had been incarcerated in a cell one floor below Bloodsworth's own cell. In a 2009 guest lecture at Florida Atlantic University, Bloodsworth said that he and Ruffner sometimes spotted each other during workouts.

In light of the new DNA evidence, Ruffner was charged in Maryland for the rape and murder of the girl. In 2004, he pleaded guilty to the crimes and was sentenced to life in prison.

== Life after prison ==
Bloodsworth served as a program officer for The Justice Project. He helped gain support for the Innocence Protection Act (IPA) of 2001, later included in the omnibus Justice for All Act of 2004. Among other federal funding initiatives, the IPA established the "Kirk Bloodsworth Post-Conviction DNA Testing Program", intended to help states defray the costs of post-conviction DNA testing. Bloodsworth has served as a consultant on the death penalty and a prominent public speaker against it. He helped gain repeal of the death penalty statute in Maryland.

== Representation in other media ==
- Bloodsworth is the subject of the documentary Bloodsworth: An Innocent Man (2015), directed by Gregory Bayne.
- The Bloodsworth case is a three-part series on YouTube's Murder with Friends (2018), a popular Web Series.

== See also ==
- List of exonerated death row inmates
- List of wrongful convictions in the United States
