= Christopher Vaughn =

American man convicted of the murder of his wife

Christopher Vaughn is an American man convicted of the murder of his wife, Kimberly, and the couple's three children on June 14, 2007. All four members of the family were shot in their SUV while on the way to a Springfield, IL waterpark. Christopher sustained minor injuries to his wrist and leg while the other four sustained fatal gunshot wounds. Prosecutors alleged that he shot his family to death in wooded area in Channahon, IL. Vaughn maintains his innocence and claims that Kimberly shot her family before committing suicide. Wrongful Conviction advocacy group Investigating Innocence is investigating the case.

== History ==
Christopher Vaughn, his wife Kimberly, and their three children moved to Illinois from the Seattle area approximately two years prior to the fatal shooting. Christopher had started a licensed private detective agency in Washington called Stone Bridge Security that specialized in cybercrime. Kimberly began working on a degree in Criminal Justice with plans to join the business as a private investigator. The Vaughns decided to close the business when Christopher was offered a job at Navigant Consulting's computer forensics group, and the family moved to Oswego, IL in 2005. The couple had three children: Abigayle, 12, Cassandra, 11, and Blake, 8. Kimberly, then 34, was a stay-at-home mother at the time of her death.

== Shooting ==
In the early morning hours of June 14, 2007, the family left their home in Oswego to drive to a waterpark in Springfield, IL. Around 5:20am, a motorist near Joliet, IL noticed Christopher Vaughn limping away from his vehicle. He had two bullet wounds: one on his left wrist, and one on his left leg. When asked if he was injured in a crash, he replied, “No, I think my wife shot me”. Kimberly and the children were still inside the vehicle, having sustained fatal gunshot wounds. His children had each been shot twice and his wife was slumped over the center console with a single contact gunshot wound under her chin. A 9mm handgun belonging to Christopher Vaughn was found on the floor at her feet.

== Investigation ==
Although the witness at the scene recalled Vaughn saying that his wife had pulled the trigger, Christopher was unable to recall the event after he reached the hospital, telling a nurse, “You should call my wife. She gets mad when I don’t call her.”

Christopher was brought to the police station after being treated at the hospital and was interviewed for nearly 14 hours on June 14. He returned for two more interviews on June 15 and 17th. He told investigators that he remembered Kimberly asking him to pull over on the frontage road because she was nauseous. The nausea was a symptom of her migraine headaches for which she took Nortriptyline and Topamax. He remembered pulling off, parking in front of a cell phone tower along a frontage road, and getting out of the car to check the back tires. He told police he had re-secured the strap on the topper, got back into the vehicle, and noticed that his leg was bleeding, but he claimed to have no memory of him or his family members being shot. Later, when police suggested in interview that Kimberly may have shot him, he defended her, “There was no way she could have hurt the kids."

He told police that he first learned he'd been shot at the hospital when the doctor told him, and that he didn't understand who could have shot him; no one else was around and Kimberly didn't have a gun. Later in the interviews, detectives informed him that they were not dead and asked what happened. Christopher asked detectives to bring Kimberly in so he could talk to her. He denied being involved in their deaths.

== Trial ==
Christopher Vaughn was charged with four counts of first-degree murder and the case went to trial in August 2012. The prosecution originally sought the death penalty against Vaughn, but Governor Patrick Quinn signed the bill abolishing the death penalty in 2011 while he was awaiting trial.

The prosecution argued that his version of events did not match the forensic evidence found within the vehicle. They argued that Vaughn killed his family because he was frustrated with his wife and wanted to live off-the-grid in the Canadian wilderness. In the months preceding the murders, he had corresponded with an individual who lived in Ottawa about camping and living in the woods. He also took a trip to the Yukon Territories in May 2007. Vaughn allegedly asked him to help him fake his own death so that Kimberly could collect the insurance. Vaughn also visited strip clubs on a number of occasions, and spent approximately $4,780 during two visits on June 6 and June 12. Prosecutors called two exotic dancers to the stand to testify about their conversations with Vaughn. According to one, he visited her club four or five times and stated that he wanted to leave his wife and move to Canada to live in the woods. Another testified that Vaughn told her he was single and did not have any children.

During his trial, a forensic pathologist testified that Kimberly Vaughn was taking two medications known to cause increased risk of suicidal thoughts and side effects including confusion or agitation. This was central to Vaughn's case that Kimberly was distraught over problems in their marriage and killed their children, shot and wounded her husband and then killed herself.

He was convicted and sentenced to four consecutive life sentences.

== Innocence claims ==
Vaughn's defense team maintains that Kimberly was the one who fired the gun. Robert Deel, a Crime Scene Investigator who worked on the case has openly supported Vaughn, claiming that the bullet trajectory and other forensic evidence points to Kimberly as the shooter. He claims that tunnel vision played a role in the investigation. "I wasn't being listened to by them," he once said. "In fact, every time that I offered up something that was contrary to what they said, they had some reason why I didn't know what I was talking about, and basically it all fell back on that Christopher Vaughn is a criminal mastermind and he knows all about crime scenes and that he would be able to fool me into thinking that something else happened." Deel also claimed that "[T]hey would change their theory of what happened to try to match the evidence rather than letting the evidence dictate to you the events that occurred”.

The defense has also noted that aspects of the state's forensic case were disproven. For example, the state asserted on the probable cause affidavit that Christopher unbuckled his wife's seatbelt after he shot her. A large bloodstain was found at the point where the latch came together. The state believed that Kimberly's wound was the source of this blood, however DNA testing revealed that it was Christopher's blood. A transfer stain on Kimberly's right thumb indicates that she unbuckled the seatbelt after Christopher was shot.

Vaughn's defense noted that at the time of her death, Kimberly was taking Nortriptyline and Topamax for migraine headaches. A year after her death, the FDA released a report stating that a statistically significant risk of suicide was seen in patients taking Topamax, as does Nortryptiline. In an email written two weeks before her death, she told Christopher that she informed her doctor she was experiencing “a big personality change and anxiety change.” Kimberly's level of Nortryptiline was found to be in the low end of the toxic range. The defense theorized that mood and behavior changes brought on by these medications could have caused suicidal and homicidal behavior. They also theorized that Christopher suffered from dissociative amnesia brought on by witnessing a traumatic event, which led to him having no memory of the event.

Wrongful conviction advocacy group Investigating Innocence is investigating the case. Wrongful conviction advocate Jason Flom and Lava Records, which produces the Wrongful Convictions Podcast, matched donor contributions to complete the crime scene reconstruction.

== Media ==
Bill Clutter, co-founder of the Illinois Innocence Project and founder of the national wrongful conviction advocacy organization Investigating Innocence, worked on the Christopher Vaughn case and was featured on a 12-part iHeartRadio podcast about it, called Murder in Illinois.

Dr. Phil did an episode on the Christopher Vaughn case on October 11, 2021. The guests were Christopher Vaughn's parents.
