= Wrongful conviction of David Camm =

American police officer wrongfully convicted of murder (born 1964)

David Camm
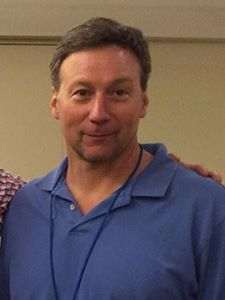
- Born: March 23, 1964 (age 62); Floyd Memorial Hospital, New Albany, Floyd County, Indiana, U.S.
- Known for: Retired Indiana state trooper tried three times for the murders of his wife and two children (two reversed convictions, acquitted after third trial). Responding officer to the discovery of Shanda Sharer's body.

David Ray Camm (born March 23, 1964) is a former trooper of the Indiana State Police (ISP) who spent 13 years in prison after twice being wrongfully convicted of the murders of his wife, Kimberly, and his two young children at their home in Georgetown, Indiana, on September 28, 2000. He was released from custody in 2013 after his third trial resulted in an acquittal. Charles Boney is serving time for the murders of Camm's wife and two children.

== Initial investigation ==
Police were summoned to the Camm residence shortly after 9:30 p.m. on September 28, 2000, to find Kim, Bradley, and Jill Camm shot to death in the garage of their home. David Camm told police that he returned home from playing basketball at a nearby church and found his wife shot to death on the garage floor. He then saw his daughter, Jill, sitting upright in the backseat, still strapped in her seatbelt. Brad was draped over the driver's side of the backseat as though he had been trying to get away from the assailant. Since both Kim and Jill had been shot through the head, Camm stated that he thought his son, who had no head injuries, might still be alive, so he entered the passenger front of the Bronco, went through the two front bucket seats and grabbed his son, taking him out, putting him on the garage floor, and giving him CPR.

In the process, Camm had placed his left knee in the middle of the back seat, causing Jill's head and body to slump forward and to the left, contacting Camm's T-shirt. Bradley Camm was found lying on the garage floor and a later autopsy found he had been shot through his torso, severing his spine. Unseen in the darkened garage and not collected by evidence technicians was a gray sweatshirt bearing the name of BACKBONE in the collar. An ISP lab analyst later found unidentified female DNA on the front of the shirt and a private lab, hired by Camm's defense attorney Mike McDaniel, found unidentified male DNA in the collar. The blood and DNA of Kim Camm had also been discovered on that same sweatshirt.

=== First theory of the crime ===
Many false leads hampered the investigation of the murders. The theory of the crime at the time of the arrest was that Camm returned home from playing basketball, shot his family, and attempted a clean-up before abandoning this and calling the Sellersburg State Police post for help. Rob Stites, a crime scene photographer who was believed by the police to be a blood-spatter analyst, told police there was a clean-up at the crime scene and high-velocity impact spatter on the shirt Camm was wearing.

Another piece of seemingly incriminating evidence was a phone bill indicating Camm had made a phone call from the residence at 7:19 p.m. on the evening of the murder. He claimed to be playing basketball at the church from 7:00 p.m. to approximately 9:30 p.m. that evening. Camm also had a history of infidelity, which police believed was the motive for the murders.

Before long, the erroneous nature of several pieces of evidence was revealed. While the infidelity accusations were credible, it was discovered that most of the rest of the evidence on the probable cause affidavit was either inaccurate or unreliable. Based on the autopsies and other evidence, the time of death was determined to be around 8:00 p.m., far earlier than the original estimate of 9:30 p.m. giving Camm an alibi. The phone call that seemed to prove Camm was lying about his alibi was disproven. The phone company discovered the inaccuracy stemmed from the confusion regarding Indiana's complicated time zones. The call was made an hour earlier, at 6:19 p.m.

The clean-up at the crime scene and the blood spatter on David's shirt were also questioned. It was discovered that there was not, in fact, a crime scene clean-up but the usual separation of blood when exposed to air for a while. Several other areas that Stites had claimed to be high-velocity impact spatter found at the crime scene were inaccurate interpretations, calling into question Stites' abilities. Investigators stated that they investigated the foreign DNA on the sweatshirt found at the crime scene. However, there were no matches when it was run through CODIS.

=== Second theory of the crime ===
The discovery that the time of the murder was over an hour earlier than previously thought meant that Camm now had an alibi. Eleven witnesses told police he was with them playing basketball from 7:00 p.m. until after 9:00 p.m. The police changed their theory of the crime from a murder following the basketball game to one in which he snuck out of the basketball game, committed the murders, and then slipped back in without being noticed.

== Trials and appeals ==
=== First trial ===
The case went to trial in the spring of 2002, with the blood spatter as the main forensic evidence and the affairs listed as the motive. The prosecution argued that the bloodstains on Camm's shirt were the result of a high-velocity impact spatter, proving he was the shooter. Defense experts assert that the pattern was caused by transfer when his shirt had contact with Jill's hair as he was removing his son from the vehicle.

During the trials, Bart Epstein, a bloodstain analyst for the defense, along with another analyst, demonstrated how the blood stains could have gotten on the shirt by running T-shirts over wigs containing blood. Similar patterns to the one on Camm's shirt were produced. Nevertheless, he was convicted. In August 2004, the Indiana Court of Appeals overturned the conviction, citing the trial judge's decision to allow testimony from a dozen women who claimed they had had affairs with Camm or had been propositioned by him, which unfairly biased the jury because the prosecutor did not adequately connect those relationships with the murders. In November 2004, prosecutor Keith Henderson refiled charges against Camm.

=== Discovery of a second suspect ===
In early 2005, the defense asked that DNA from two unknown persons found on the sweatshirt at the crime scene be run through CODIS again. Defense lawyers claim the prosecution refused until they were finally compelled to by a court order. A match was found for the male DNA and it was discovered that particular DNA sample was never run prior to the first trial despite assurances from the prosecutor that the sample had been analyzed and returned no matches. Charles Boney, a convicted felon from nearby New Albany, was identified as the owner of the sweatshirt. He was out on parole at the time of the crime, having been convicted of committing a series of armed attacks on women, several of them involving the theft of shoes. The most recent attack was the armed robbery and attempted abduction of three women at gunpoint.

In some cases, there was evidence of stalking; some of Boney's previous victims had reported receiving harassing phone calls for a couple of months prior to the attacks asking them what they were wearing and if they were wearing high-heeled shoes. He had previously admitted to police that he had a foot fetish, a detail he later discussed with numerous news outlets. This detail was suspicious to the defense: Kim Camm's shoes were removed and lined up neatly on top of the vehicle in the midst of a messy crime scene. Kim had a series of bruises and abrasions to the top of both of her feet. Boney was interviewed and took a polygraph, in which he was determined to be deceptive. He denied any involvement, claiming that he donated the sweatshirt to charity and was cleared as a suspect. Two weeks later, his palm print was discovered on Kim's vehicle and he was arrested.

The other DNA sample was later identified as belonging to Mala Singh Mattingly, Boney's then-girlfriend. It was discovered after his arrest that Stan Faith, the prosecutor in Camm's first trial, was Boney's attorney. During questioning, Boney asked to be represented by Faith but was told it was a conflict of interest. Boney admits to having discussed the case with Faith prior to becoming a suspect in the case. When asked about the failure of his office to identify Boney, Faith denied any intentional wrongdoing stating: "I regret it. I deeply regret it, but the myth that's growing out of this is false."

=== Third theory of the crime ===
Boney gave a number of conflicting confessions before he finally settled on one in which he was lured to the Camm residence under the guise of selling a gun to David Camm. He admitted to placing the shoes on the vehicle, but claimed he did it only coincidentally and not related to his foot fetish. Boney claimed that on September 28 he arrived at 7:00 p.m. to meet Camm at the Camm residence to sell him a weapon—a meeting they arranged through chance meetings and without the use of a telephone. He handed Camm the weapon wrapped in his gray sweatshirt that was later found at the crime scene. Within seconds, Kim arrived home in her Bronco, Camm followed the Bronco into the garage and Boney heard three shots fired. Boney alleges that Camm then attempted to shoot him and stated "you did this". He claims that the gun either jammed or ran out of bullets. With Camm holding a now non-functioning weapon, Boney ran after Camm, chasing him back into the garage. Camm entered the house while Boney tripped and fell over Kim's shoes, which were off of her feet and on the garage floor. Boney stated that he picked up the shoes and placed them atop the Bronco. He then leaned against the vehicle to look at Brad and Jill, who were inside the vehicle, deceased. He explained that this was why his hand print was found on the vehicle. Based on testimony from other prosecution witnesses, Kim, Brad, and Jill were still alive and at the pool until 7:15 p.m. The timeline given by Boney of a shooting shortly after 7 p.m. also conflicts with the prosecution's timeline, which aligns with the medical examiner's estimation of an 8pm time of death. Aside from Boney's story, no additional evidence was ever found connecting Camm and Boney.

=== Mala Singh Mattingly ===
After Mattingly's DNA was identified, she was interviewed regarding her knowledge of the crime. She told police that Boney returned home after midnight on the night of the murders. "He was breathing really hard—excited somewhat," Mattingly said. She said that he showed her a gun, had a bloody scraped knee and was sweating profusely. The next morning, she said, Boney asked her and his mother to watch news coverage regarding the murders. She testified that she left the room to shower while he and his mother began arguing. Mattingly's blood was found mixed with Brad and Kim Camm's blood on the sweatshirt at the crime scene.

=== Second trial ===
Following Boney's arrest in 2005, Camm and Boney were charged as co-conspirators in the murder of Kim and her children. Boney was tried first, convicted, and sentenced to 225 years in prison. Camm's trial began on January 17, 2006. With the extramarital affairs now inadmissible, new Floyd County prosecutor, Keith Henderson (a Republican who had defeated Democrat Stan Faith in the latter's bid for re-election) argued that Camm had been molesting his daughter and killed his wife and children to cover up the crime. The evidence was a single blunt force trauma injury to Jill's genitals. A medical examiner who testified for the defense disagreed with the state's theory that it was the result of sexual abuse, arguing the child's hymen was intact and it was just one of many blunt force trauma injuries sustained by being struck during the fatal attack. The prosecution presented Boney's story that Camm was the shooter but Boney was there to sell Camm a gun. Camm was convicted a second time on March 3, 2006, and was sentenced to life without parole. Camm appealed the conviction, citing the prejudicial nature of the molestation allegations and the lack of evidence linking the injuries to him. The Indiana Supreme Court granted a second reversal, stating "Missing from this record is any competent evidence of the premise that the defendant molested the child."

=== Third trial ===
The motive alleged by the prosecution in the third trial was the life insurance policies purchased by Kim Camm. Boney testified against Camm for the first time, accusing him of luring him out to the home before shooting his own family and then turning the gun on him. The third trial saw the introduction of new DNA evidence that was not presented in the first two trials. Dr. Richard Eikelenboom testified that he found touch DNA consistent with Boney in several places on the clothing of both Kim and Jill Camm. Boney's DNA was found on Kim Camm's underwear, on the arm of her shirt above an abrasion on her arm thought to be the result of the struggle with her killer, on Kim's broken off fingernail, and on the stomach of Jill Camm's shirt. These results seem to discredit Boney's assertion that he never touched the victims. Defense co-counsel Stacy Uliana argued that if Boney physically attacked the family, which the DNA seemed to suggest, it was unlikely that Camm was the shooter.

With the touch DNA evidence placing Boney in a more active role in the crime, the prosecution introduced yet another theory of the crime near the end of the third trial when Judge Jonathan Dartt made a controversial ruling that the jury instructions could include an instruction allowing the jury to find Camm guilty if they believed he "aided and abetted" Boney during the murders. This instruction applied if the jury believed Camm had involvement in the murders, but was not the shooter. The defense strenuously objected to the inclusion of this instruction, citing not only the complete lack of evidence that Camm had ever even met Boney, but that the instruction violated the law against double jeopardy; Camm had been acquitted on conspiracy charges during the second trial. Camm's defense attorneys argued this new theory of the crime essentially threw out the blood spatter evidence—the only major piece of forensic evidence tying Camm to the crime. Following the verdict, Richard Kammen stated: "All of a sudden to say 'well if all our evidence is wrong, go ahead and convict him anyway' this jury was a smart jury, they clearly saw through that."

=== Acquittal ===
On October 24, 2013, the jury found Camm not guilty of all charges. Camm's attorneys described it as "vindication". By then, NBC News reported that costs to Floyd County had reached an "estimated $4.5 million".

== Response to the case ==
=== Verdict ===
The public reaction to the verdict was mixed. Many Louisville and Southern Indiana residents who lived through the extensive media coverage were surprised by the not guilty verdict in the third trial. In reaction to the verdict, a local resident stated "A lot of people are — just like I am — completely shocked, and a lot of people think that he should not be out." Nationally, the Camm case garnered a lot of attention from wrongful conviction advocacy groups who believed that the previous convictions were miscarriages of justice.

Bill Lamb, President and General Manager of WDRB, the Fox affiliate in Louisville, Kentucky, issued a public apology to Camm stating: "Seven years ago, I did a Point of View criticizing David Camm's attorneys for seeking yet another appeal right after his second conviction for the murder of his family. I wondered when Indiana taxpayers would get to stop paying fortunes in trial expenses, and why any accused killer could possibly deserve so many 'do-overs'. Well, now we have the answer: When they're not guilty." After the third trial, a juror, in response to the question "Do you think that they intentionally wanted to convict an innocent man?" responded "I would hope not but ... I sense that the State Police had a hard time admitting that they had made a mistake."

=== Blood spatter evidence ===
The heavy reliance on blood spatter evidence in this case was widely criticized. In his review of the case, former federal prosecutor Kent Wicker said "Blood spatter evidence has come under a lot of criticism in the past few years. In 2009 the National Academy of Sciences issued a report criticizing the scientific foundation of that." The report calls for more standardization within a number of forensic fields including blood spatter analysis. The report highlights the tendency of blood spatter analysts to overstate the reliability of their methods in the courtroom.

Dr. Robert Shaler, founding director of the Penn State Forensic Science Program, decried blood spatter analysis as unreliable in the Camm case. "The problem in this case is the number of stains are minimal," he said. "I think you're really on the edge of reliability." Dr. Shaler said blood stain pattern analysis as a science is "essentially guesswork". The problem with blood spatter analysis is that "you do not have the supporting underlying science" to back up your conclusions. All of the blood spatter analysts involved in the case from the start (aside from Stites) have been "experts" in the traditional sense. The problem is "We have two opinions in this case. That, in essence, is a 50 percent error rate."

=== Perjury admission ===
Evidence of misconduct regarding the blood spatter was uncovered when, in the third trial, Stites testified for the defense, admitting he had perjured himself in the first two trials. Stites' assertion that the spots on Camm's shirt were high velocity impact spray (HVIS) was the cornerstone of the probable cause affidavit that led to Camm's arrest and his testimony at the first two trials helped the prosecution win Camm's convictions. He had previously testified that he was an expert blood spatter pattern analyst and a professor at Portland State University who was in the process of attaining a Ph.D. — credentials which were fabrications.

Stites asserts that Floyd County prosecutor Stan Faith helped create those fraudulent credentials. During the third trial, he outlined how he was sent to the crime scene by Rod Englert to photograph and take notes. Despite his lack of formal training in the field or work experience as a crime scene analyst, his notes ended up being used in the probable cause affidavit, with him being listed as a "crime scene reconstructionist", a title that did not apply to him. The defense pointed out several aspects of Stites' notes that were later proven to be false including "HVIS" on the garage door, later proven to be a petroleum based-product and not blood. Stites' opinion that there was a clean-up at the crime scene involving bleach was also incorrect. The confusion came from the unfamiliar look of the blood after the serum had separated from the blood cells. Regarding his actions, he commented, "It was a dumb thing...In hindsight, I would have kept my mouth shut." Stites was not charged with perjury for his testimony in the previous two trials.

=== Criticism of the prosecution ===
A number of legal experts have criticized the way the case was handled. Thomas Schornhorst, a professor emeritus of the Indiana University's Mauer School of Law, said that cases had been overturned repeatedly because they have "pushed the envelope" with other evidence, fearing that they would not get a conviction on bloodstain evidence alone. Shawn Boyne, of Indiana University's Robert H. McKinney School of Law, highlighted the Camm trials as an example of the problems within the American justice system. Boyne stated that the judges in these trials allowed the prosecutors to present "specious claims of motive designed to paint the defendant with a broad stroke of guilt and moral condemnation and overcome a lack of physical evidence". Boyne stated "the state overreached and that overreaching did not serve the cause of justice". Camm's defense team has long been critical of their inability to present evidence of Boney's involvement, particularly when the prosecution was allowed to speculate about Camm's motives. Despite Boney's history of stalking and armed violence against women, his past crimes were ruled inadmissible.

=== Errors in evidence collection ===
By the third trial, the backbone of the defense's case was the evidence of police and prosecutorial misconduct in the case. The defense argued that the investigation was riddled by critical mistakes, both in the collection of evidence and in the investigation of Boney as a suspect. The sweatshirt found at the crime scene revealed Boney's DNA, his girlfriend's DNA, his prison nickname, and his Department of Corrections ID number. Kim Camm's shoes were also lined up on the top of the vehicle. Boney has a long history of fetish-driven assaults that included the theft of shoes. It is unclear how the investigative team missed these pieces of evidence during the initial investigation. The defense team was told that the evidence had been thoroughly investigated.

=== Errors in the investigation of Charles Boney ===
The defense argued that the police should have also taken notice when Boney's story went through so many revisions. They noted that many details of his story were first suggested by police detectives in recorded interviews, notably the detail regarding the gun wrapped in the sweatshirt. Other details of his story were changed following discussions with detectives who pointed out the discrepancies. Defense witness Dr. Kim Rossmo, a criminal justice professor at Texas State University, testified that Boney was never investigated properly and that his claims were never independently verified. Instead of treating Boney like a suspect, "They treated him as an anomaly to their theory, that somehow had to be explained away", adding, "I think there were six different confessions from Mr. Boney. I don't think Boney ever told the truth about what happened... he's only telling the police enough to get around the last particular contradiction." He testified that the majority of the oversights during the investigation were caused by confirmation bias: a tendency to believe information that confirms your preconceived notions and place less weight on information that doesn't. Rossmo argued that the police were swayed by the early misleading evidence and came to the conclusion that Camm was guilty before any of the forensic evidence was examined. He believes this phenomenon caused the investigators to ignore the DNA on the sweatshirt and when Boney was finally identified, they downplayed the significance and attempted to make it fit within their established theory of the crime. Ultimately, the jurors in the third trial believed the defense's criticisms of the investigation: "They tried to make the evidence fit their theory of the case," a juror said in interview.

Lead defense attorney Richard Kammen accused police of feeding Boney a false story designed to implicate Camm and coerce Boney into testifying against Camm by playing on his fear of racial prejudice within the criminal justice system by telling him that a black man accused of killing a white family would get the death penalty if he didn't cooperate. During interrogations, he was reminded on several occasions of the likelihood of getting the death penalty on the basis of his race and that the best way to avoid the death penalty was to testify against Camm. The defense cited a suspicious series of undocumented and unrecorded phone calls—33 in all—between Boney and the Floyd County Prosecutor's office in the two-week span between his DNA being identified and his arrest.

=== Evidence tampering allegations ===
Another allegation that surfaced involved a distant relative of Boney named Myron Wilkerson (1959–2012). Wilkerson was a police officer but was not assigned to the case. He met with Boney privately at the station following his arrest. Two months later, it was learned that Wilkerson had removed Kim Camm's phone from the evidence room without signing it out and taken it to his residence. When the phone was located and returned to the police, it was found to have been wiped clean of fingerprints. Wilkerson died prior to the third trial and therefore was not charged with evidence tampering for his actions.

=== Witness tampering allegations ===
In addition to testimony by Rob Stites alleging subornation of perjury, several other allegations of witness tampering surfaced during the case. Lynn Scamahorn, a DNA analyst from the Indiana State Police claimed that during the first trial, the prosecutor (Stan Faith) threatened her when she refused to perjure herself and testify that she had found Camm's DNA on Boney's sweatshirt. Fingerprint analyst John Singleton reported a similar encounter. He claims Faith wanted him to "shade testimony" while testifying regarding the then unidentified palm print on Kim Camm's Bronco that was later determined to belong to Boney.

The defense also accused the state of witness tampering and presenting false and misleading testimony regarding the molestation allegations. During the first trial, the prosecution alleged that the injuries Jill sustained happened during the attack, as testified to by the state medical examiner. During the second trial, they altered their timeline to implicate Camm instead of Boney on the basis of testimony by a single witness who changed her theory at the last minute. "Dr. Spivack, before in her deposition, told us that the injuries occurred near the time of death due to the painful nature of them. Today, on the stand, she backtracked to fit the state's theory." said defense attorney Stacy Uliana. Following the verdict, the jurors explained that they made their decision largely on the molestation allegations, and specifically, on the testimony of Spivack, who testified that the child was molested several hours prior to her death instead of during the attack.

DNA analyst Lynn Scamahorn claimed prosecutor Faith also attempted to get her to commit perjury by testifying that lab results indicated the comforter from the master bedroom in the Camm household contained vaginal secretions or saliva from Jill to help bolster their claims that Jill had been molested; no such test exists. The fraudulent testimony of Stites and the attempted coercion of Scamahorn were featured in a forensic textbook called Forensic Fraud: Evaluating Law Enforcement and Forensic Science Cultures in the Context of Examiner Misconduct.

== Legacy ==
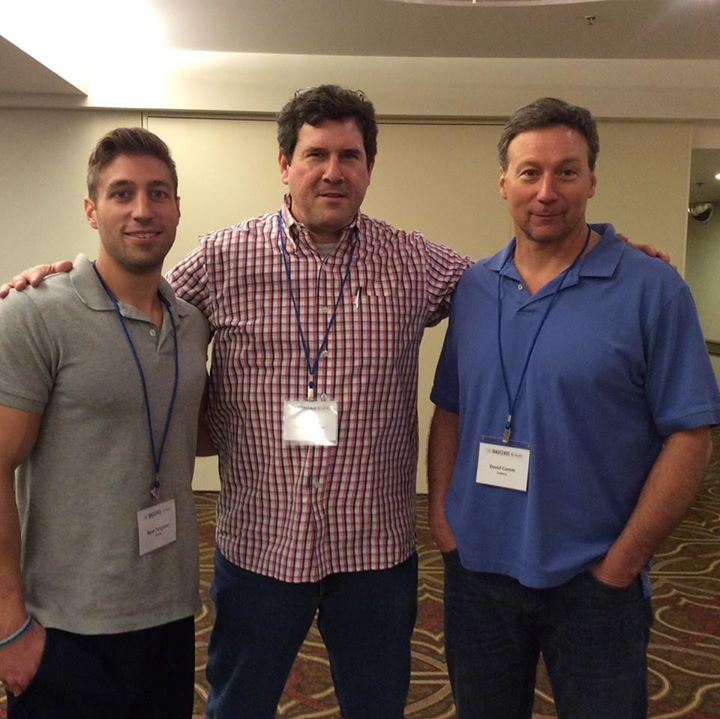
David Camm (right) with fellow exoneree Ryan Ferguson (left) and Bill Clutter of Investigating Innocence

In December 2013, Camm gave his first local media interview following the verdict, and attempted to clear up the misconceptions regarding Boney's criminal history. Camm also announced that he had been hired as a case coordinator for Investigating Innocence, a national nonprofit that provides criminal-defense investigations for inmates. Camm reports that he has forged a friendship with the third-trial jurors. In early December 2013, he met with jurors from the third trial over dinner at a café in Lebanon, Indiana.

== Civil lawsuits ==
In 2005, prosecution witness Rod Englert filed a lawsuit against several of the defense witnesses in the libel case. The lawsuit accused the defendants of saying Englert embellished his credentials, misrepresented his qualifications and experience, and provided false testimony in court. Englert had testified for the prosecution that Camm had high velocity blood spatter on the shirt he was wearing the night of the murders. Camm was reportedly facing a civil suit filed by his late wife's parents over the estimated $625,000 Camm was set to collect from life insurance and Kim Camm's 401K fund. As of 2013, Frank and Janice Renn steadfastly maintain their belief in Camm's guilt.

In May 2014, Camm served notice of his intent to sue Floyd County and the State of Indiana for $30 million. Camm settled with Floyd County for $450,000. In January 2018, Camm's civil rights lawsuit against members of the Indiana State Police, prosecutors, and other officials, was dismissed by US District Court judge Tanya Walton Pratt. In the ruling, the court explained it believed that there had been probable cause to charge Camm with murder and that due to Indiana's Tort Claims Act, some of the defendants were immune to liability.

On September 10, 2019, the United States Court of Appeals for the Seventh Circuit reversed the District Court in part stating, "In sum, we reverse and remand for trial on Camm’s Fourth Amendment claim against Stites, Englert, Faith, and Clemons to the extent that the claim rests on the first probable-cause affidavit. Trial is also warranted on the Brady claim against the same four defendants for suppression of Stites’s lack of qualifications and against Faith and Clemons for suppression of the facts surrounding their handling of the DNA profile on Boney’s sweatshirt. In all other respects, we affirm the judgment." The reversal allowed Camm to sue for false arrest. A settlement of Camm's final lawsuits was announced April 28, 2022, with Camm being awarded $4.6 million from the state of Indiana.

== Media coverage ==
The case has been covered widely in the media. In January 2014, Dateline NBC aired a two-hour special entitled Mystery on Lockart Road and the case has been covered three times on 48 Hours on CBS. Two books have been written about the case: One Deadly Night was published in 2005, and Searching For Justice in 2013, as well as a chapter in Jane Velez-Mitchell's book Secrets Can Be Murder: The Killer Next Door.

In 2022 and 2025, Camm's former defense investigator, Gary M. Dunn, a 27-year FBI agent, published two books, respectively: Their Bloody Lies & Persecution of David Camm, Part I, details how two sets of ISP investigators jumped to erroneous and then outright false conclusions, assisted by a faux blood stain expert and supposed crime scene re-constructionist, while being directed by a politicized county prosecutor, Stan Faith. The second book, David Camm The Reckoning, Part II, continues with the deep dive into the incompetence and corruption of the "Fresh Eyes" investigators and prosecutors and the second wrongful conviction of Camm; the evidence by the second prosecutor which, when discovered, resulted in the dismissal of that prosecutor; and the third trial.

== See also ==
- Innocence Project
- List of miscarriage of justice cases
- List of wrongful convictions in the United States
- Overturned convictions in the United States
- Clarence Elkins
- Shareef Cousin
- Juan Rivera
