= Investigating Innocence =

U.S. non-profit organization

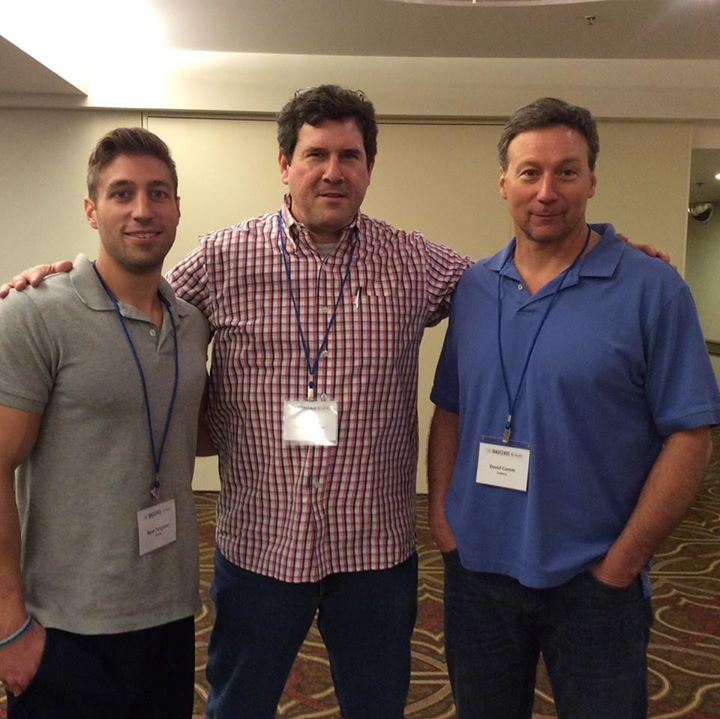
Investigating Innocence founder Bill Clutter (center) with exonerees Ryan Ferguson and David Camm (right)

Investigating Innocence is a nonprofit wrongful conviction advocacy organization that provides criminal defense investigations for inmates in the United States. Investigating Innocence was founded in 2013 by private investigator and Illinois Innocence Project cofounder Bill Clutter to assist nationwide Innocence Project groups in investigating innocence claims. "Once we have a case that meets our criteria, we'll put private investigators to work on it. A lot of these cases need investigators," said Kelly Thompson, executive director of Investigating Innocence. Investigating Innocence also has a board composed of exonerees that reviews incoming cases.

Investigating Innnocence also advocated heavily for the creation of a statewide Conviction Integrity Unit for the state of Illinois, where Investigating Innocence is based. The state established its first Conviction Integrity Unit in November of 2024.

== Conviction Integrity Unit ==
Beginning in 2019, Investigating Innocence heavily advocated for the institution of a Conviction Integrity Unit in Illinois. Conviction integrity units, which investigate innocence claims, have been established in recent years in major metropolitan areas such as Dallas, New York, and Chicago. As government organizations, these groups have a greater ability to access evidence and assist defendants than independent innocence organizations. Illinois has a conviction integrity unit, which has seen over 70 convictions overturned since 2017, but it serves only the Chicago area and smaller counties lack funding for such units. "It would be a financial burden for this office to have a truly independent staff of at least one investigator and one attorney to review the claims, and there are not enough claims like this in a county like Sangamon to warrant those resources," Clutter said. "But on a state level, it makes sense to have it housed in the attorney general's office." In November of 2024, Attorney General Kwame Raoul announced the establishment of the state's first ever Conviction Integrity Unit within the Attorney General's office. “Over the past five years, we have worked with state’s attorneys, appellate justices, the Department of Justice and others to establish a unit within my office that would solely focus on reviewing wrongful convictions, seeking relief when warranted and preventing the devastation caused when someone is wrongfully convicted,” Raoul said. “Wrongful convictions destroy lives, diminish faith in our criminal justice system, and put victims and the general public at risk, as true perpetrators of crimes are able to escape punishment. As a career prosecutor and the state’s top law enforcement official, I look forward to the critical work this unit will do in collaboration with state’s attorneys and stakeholders across the state to ensure integrity in convictions.”

== Successful Exonerations ==
=== David Camm ===
One of the organization's most prominent cases was the exoneration of David Camm, a former Indiana state trooper who was wrongfully convicted of the murders of his wife and two children. Approximately five years after he was arrested, DNA evidence identified a convicted felon named Charles Boney as having been at the crime scene. Boney is currently serving 225 years for the murders.

On October 24, 2013, David Camm, walked free after 13-years in prison after a jury in Lebanon, Indiana found him not guilty in a third re-trial. His case was the first exoneration for Investigating Innocence, which was started earlier that year. Bill Clutter, who started the project, was a member of Camm's defense team and suggested conducting an animated crime scene reconstruction, which helped persuade the jury that David Camm is innocent. Students at the Indiana University assisted Clutter and the Camm defense team in reviewing the case.

Clutter simulated how the actual killer, Charles Boney, infamously known as the "Shoe Bandit" who had been released from prison a few weeks before the murders after serving nearly a decade for holding women at gunpoint, braced his left hand leaving a palm print on the outside of Kim Camm's Ford Bronco as he knelt on the floorboard and extended his right hand to fire the gun that killed five-year-old Jill, and her brother Brad, age 7.

David Camm, a decorated Indiana Police Officer, was wrongfully charged with the murders of his family based on junk science.

On September 28, 2000, David Camm came home at approximately 9:26 p.m. and found his wife Kimberly, and his two children Bradley, 7, and Jill, 5, shot to death in the garage of their home in Georgetown, Indiana. His wife and two children were last seen leaving swim practice and heading home around 7:00 p.m., which was about the same time David arrived at the Georgetown Community Church to play basketball. David, a former Indiana State Police trooper, had been playing basketball with 11 other people at the time his wife and children were killed.

Three days later, David Camm was charged with his family's murder based on a misinterpretation of bloodstain patterns on his t-shirt. There were eight small stains of blood that were mistakenly interpreted as high velocity impact spatter by a crime scene photographer who had no formal training or experience in bloodstain pattern analysis. The photographer, Robert Stites, was sent to the crime scene by Rodney Englert, who was hired by Floyd County prosecutors as a blood stain and crime scene expert; since Englert was not available to visit the crime scene, he sent his photographer, Stites, instead.

Some of the leading experts in the country on bloodstain pattern analysis analyzed the bloodstains on David's T-shirt. They have concluded that the eight tiny bloodstains were actually transfer stains rather than high velocity impact stains from a gun. These transfer stains occurred when David's T-shirt came into contact with his daughter's hair when he removed his injured son from the vehicle.

The main expert used to convict David Camm, Rodney Englert, was also involved in convicting another innocent person, Julie Rea. Katherine Liell, who represented Camm after he was convicted, contacted private investigator Bill Clutter in June 2000 because her other client, Rea, was under investigation by a Special Prosecutor Edwin Parkinson (the same person who wrongfully charged Curtis Lovelace in Quincy, Illinois). Clutter was investigating serial killer Tommy Lynn Sells for the 1986 murders of Dyke and Karen Rhoads in Paris, Illinois, that led to two innocent men, Randy Steidl and Herb Whitlock, being framed for that murder. Clutter recognized similarities in Julie Rea's case (a knife from the kitchen of the victims was used in both cases, and the time was identical, with both crimes occurring at 4 a.m.). Since her client was facing the death penalty if she were charged, Liell planned to hire Clutter under a new reform called the Capital Litigation Trust Fund that was enacted as one of the death penalty reforms. Clutter suggested if her client was charged, the first suspect that fit the MO was a serial killer, Tommy Lynn Sells, who targeted children after his release from prison in 1997, the year Joel was murdered.

Special Prosecutor Parkinson, like prosecutors in New Albany did in the Camm case, relied on bloodstain "expert" Rod Englert to provide probable cause to arrest and convict both Camm and Rea in 2002. Englert claimed that there was evidence of cast-off stains on Julie Rea's nightshirt. Clutter was never hired by Liell because Parkinson filed notice of his intent not to seek the death penalty a few weeks before additional reforms by the Illinois Supreme Court went into effect that required that appointment of two capital qualified attorneys and enhanced discovery, allowing for depositions in cases where the death penalty was charged. Clutter conducted the post-conviction investigation for the Illinois Innocence Project, which Clutter started in 2001. His investigation found two key witnesses who placed Sells in Lawrenceville at the time of the murders, convincing Texas Ranger John Allen, who investigated Sells’ other crimes, to sign an affidavit in support of Rea's petition to overturn her conviction. She was freed from prison and received a certificate of innocence.

On June 2, 2003, an ethics complaint with the American Academy of Forensic Science was lodged against Englert by a number of other bloodstain experts alleging that Englert misrepresented his education, training and experience. This prompted Englert to sue them for slander.

The bloodstain experts who signed the complaint included Herb MacDonell (who established the professions of blood stain pattern experts in 1971, with the publication of his book Flight Characteristics and Stain Patterns of Human Blood), Stuart James, Terry Laber, and Bart Epstein.

MacDonell was also sued for slander for calling Englert among other things "a forensic whore", "liar-for-hire", "a very smooth charlatan" and "The Bin Laden of Bloodstains". All of these bloodstain experts that Englert sued have expressed opinions in support of David Camm's innocence.

Almost five years after David Camm was arrested, forensic science identified the real killer; a man named Charles Boney, a career criminal who was released from prison a few months before he killed the Camm family. Yet, despite this evidence, David Camm remains in jail today awaiting a third re-trial.

Police and prosecutors ignored a sweatshirt found at the scene that had been purchased from the Indiana Department of Corrections that had the moniker "BACKBONE" written in black ink on the inside collar. A male DNA profile indicating the wearer's DNA was discovered when forensic scientists from Cellmark, a private lab, swabbed the collar of the sweatshirt and obtained a full male DNA profile. In February 2005, Charles Boney, was identified by CODIS, which is a criminal offender DNA data base. His prison nickname was BACKBONE. In addition to this evidence, Boney's palm print was identified on the outside passenger door of the Camm's Ford Bronco, where he placed his left palm as he leaned in with his right hand holding the gun to shoot and kill both children. The children had been seated in the backseat when they were shot. Jill was still wearing her seatbelt. Her brother Brad was attempting to escape to the back-cargo area when he was shot.

Known as "The Shoe Bandit", Boney had spent almost a decade in prison for a series of crimes in Bloomington, Indiana, in which he held women at gunpoint while he satisfied his foot fetish by stealing their shoes. David Camm's wife had struggled with her attacker, who made her remove her shoes and her pants during the attack. Another key piece of forensic evidence is Kim Camm's DNA that was found on the shirt sleeve of the sweatshirt, consistent with Boney's arm around her neck and coming into contact with her mouth.

When Boney was first interviewed by the Indiana State Police, he denied knowing David Camm. Police investigators were the ones who suggested that Boney had met David Camm playing basketball when they questioned him. Boney initially denied ever playing basketball with Camm. He also claimed to have given his clothing to the Salvation Army when he was released from prison, which he later admitted was a lie. When police discovered Boney's palm print on the outside passenger door of Kim Camm's Ford Bronco a few weeks later, he changed his story again. At this point, he was given two choices. He could be either a witness for the prosecution to help prosecutors re-convict David Camm, or he could be a defendant facing the death penalty. After giving several contradictory statements, Boney claimed that he met David Camm playing basketball at a community park, after which he agreed to sell David Camm the gun that killed his family. He said he gave the gun to Camm wrapped in his sweatshirt. However, this story fails to account for how Kim Camm's DNA from saliva got on the sleeve of his sweatshirt or how Boney's hand print was found on the Camm family Bronco at the scene of the crime. Prosecutor's admitted that the credibility of its star witness Charles Boney is doubtful.

Camm's exoneration and Clutter's work on the case are featured on the Oxygen TV show Framed By the Killer.

=== Curtis Lovelace ===
In 2017, Investigating Innocence was also instrumental in the defense of Curtis Lovelace, a former prosecutor who was charged with murder in Quincy, Illinois, in the death of his first wife Cory Lovelace. The organization referred the case to the Exoneration Project, based at the University of Chicago, which agreed to represent Lovelace pro bono. Lovelace was indicted eight years after his wife died of liver failure, a condition known as fatty liver. Investigating Innocence helped develop key evidence that contributed to his exoneration. In 1990, Lovelace was team captain of the Fighting Illini football team that won the Citrus Bowl. On a change of venue, a Springfield, Illinois jury took less than two hours to acquit Lovelace on March 10, 2017.

=== Rodney Lincoln ===
Investigating Innocence conducted the investigation that linked serial killer Tommy Lynn Sells to the April 27, 1982 murder of JoAnne Tate in St. Louis for which Rodney Lincoln was wrongfully convicted. The investigation of Bill Clutter was featured on Crime Watch Daily, which triggered the recantation of Melissa DeBoer, who was seven years old and left for dead when she witnessed the murder of her mother. Melissa's mistaken identification of Rodney Lincoln led to his conviction in 1983. This new evidence persuaded Missouri Governor Eric Greitens to commute Rodney Lincoln's sentence. On June 3, 2018, Lincoln was freed from prison.

== Darlie Routier ==
Darlie Routier was accused and convicted of the murders of her two children based solely on controversial forensic evidence known as bloodstain pattern analysis.

She suffered the trauma of having been awakened by an intruder who slit her throat. This unknown assailant also stabbed her two boys sleeping next to her. Routier nearly bled to death waiting for help to arrive after calling 911. Then she was tried, convicted and sentenced to death based on the testimony of Tom Bevel, a hired bloodstain pattern expert. Bevel testified that he magnified small patterns of stains on the mother's nightshirt that he interpreted as cast-off patterns, which to him suggested that it was the mother who wielded the knife that killed her two children.

Bevel was the same bloodstain expert who was responsible for the wrongful conviction of David Camm. Camm, a ten-year veteran of the Indiana State Police, was acquitted and set free on October 24, 2013, after spending 13 years in prison for a crime he did not commit. A reconstruction of the crime scene, including a palm print and DNA, proved that the murder of his wife and two children was committed by a career criminal who was motivated by shoe fetish. Bevel interpreted eight tiny dots of blood on Camm's t-shirt and concluded these were created by high velocity impact spatter from having fired the gun that killed his family. Some of the most respected bloodstain analyst in the county came to a different conclusion—that these stains were transferred from the hairs of his daughter when David attempted CPR on his son.

Bloodstain scientists Terry Laber and Bart Epstein, who assisted with the defense of David Camm, were hired by Darlie Routier's public defenders. They analyzed the bloodstain interpretations of Bevel and came to a different conclusion about these patterns. They provided a favorable report to her defense attorneys. However, the testimony of the prosecution's bloodstain expert, Tom Bevel, went unchallenged. A private attorney was hired by Routier's family a month before trial and failed to call Laber or Epstein. He told the family he thought he could handle this through his cross-examination of Bevel. The attorney kept the retainer for himself, and spared the family the expense of flying the experts to Dallas. Routier's case is very similar to another mother who was wrongfully convicted of stabbing her 10-year-old son. On October 13, 1987, in Lawrenceville, Illinois, Julie Rea was awakened at 4 a.m. to the sound of her son's scream. When she rushed to his room across the hall, in the dark of the night, she collided with a child serial killer, Tommy Lynn Sells. He dropped the knife on the floor, and began beating her with his fists. Despite physical injuries, including a gash on her arm, a black eye, bruises and abrasions, Rea became the prime suspect. She was charged with capital murder three years later, after the elected prosecutor who resisted pressure to arrest her left office. A new prosecutor hired bloodstain "expert" Rodney Englert, who examined Rea's nightshirt and found what he interpreted as evidence of "cast-off". After she was convicted in March 2002, True crime author Diane Fanning published Through the Window: The Terrifying True Story of Cross-Country Killer Tommy Lynn Sells. Sells told Fanning about a murder in Illinois in which he had killed a child and was startled by the mother who came into the room. Two years later, Texas Ranger John Allen provided an affidavit in support of Rea's petition for a new trial. The Illinois Innocence Project had corroborated the serial killer's confession. Rea was acquitted in a new trial, and the courts have issued her a Certificate of Innocence.

Darlie Routier, however, remains on death row in Texas, awaiting execution based on the same bloodstain interpretation evidence that convicted Julie Rea. Private investigator Gary Dunn commented after the release of his client, David Camm: "Bloodstain evidence is mostly subjective. One bloodstain expert said it's like looking at the clouds, they all see something different". In 2009, the National Academy of Sciences released a critique of forensic science practices in U.S. courtrooms, noting that since the introduction of DNA testing in 1989 that "faulty science" was found to be responsible for the wrongful convictions in a number of post-conviction DNA exonerations. Bloodstain Pattern Analysis (BPA) was one of the disciplines that was criticized because of the interjection of "examiner bias". The report noted "many sources of variability arise with the production of bloodstain patterns, and their interpretation is not nearly as straightforward as the process implies". The report found, "some experts extrapolate far beyond what can be supported", and went on to conclude that "extra care must be given to the way in which the analyses are presented in court. The uncertainties associated with bloodstain pattern analysis are enormous". (Source: Strengthening Forensic Science in the United States: A Path Forward, The National Academies Press, Washington DC (2009), pp. 42, 177–179.)

== Randy Steidl ==
Bill Clutter, who founded Investigating Innocence, conducted the post-conviction investigation that helped free Randy Steidl from death row. Clutter's pre-trial investigation also helped free Rolando Cruz and Alejandro Hernandez from death row in Illinois. Clutter was among a handful of private investigators and lawyers who were credited by Chicago Tribune columnist Eric Zorn for helping to abolish the death penalty in Illinois.

== Tom McMillen ==
In April of 2019, Clutter called on Illinois Attorney General Kwame Raul to form a state-wide Conviction Integrity Unit and invited him to review the actual innocence claims of Tom McMillan. A petition filed with the Illinois Prisoner Review Board was denied by Gov. Pritzker, who accepted the recommendation of the Board. In November of 2024, Illinois Attorney General Kwame Raoul announced, after five years of planning, his office was awarded a DOJ grant and announced the establishment of a state-wide Conviction Integrity Unit. In October of 2025, Clutter called on Gov. Pritzker refer McMillan’s case to the CIU and to immediately release McMillen and his co-defendant Gary Edgington once that review is completed. who was convicted and sentenced to life in prison for the 1989 murder of Melissa Koontz. Clutter says that two key witnesses were never called to testify in the case. Their testimony would have contradicted key testimony against McMillen.

=== The Crime ===
On June 24, 1989, at 10:06 p.m., 19-year-old Melisa Koontz left work at Cub Foods where she worked as a cashier on the Southwest edge of Springfield, Illinois. Her decomposed body was found a week later July 1, 1989, laying face-up in a cornfield approximately 1.5 miles away. She had been stabbed multiple times.

Multiple witnesses observed a suspicious young white male lurking in the employee parking lot around the time Melisa exited the store.

Less than an hour later, at 10:50 p.m., her vehicle, a black Ford Escort hatchback, was discovered abandoned on the Waverly Blacktop Road, a rural country road that led to her parents' home in Waverly, IL, approximately 15.2 miles from Cub Foods.

There was circumstantial evidence of a sexual assault. The buttons of the victim's shirt were torn off and the clasp of her bra was broken. Her skirt had been rolled up. DNA testing on the bra and shirt have identified a partial male DNA profile eliminating Tom McMillen and his co-defendants Gary Edgington and Donald Johnston as the source.

Tom McMillen was charged with capital murder on May 15, 1990, accused of the murder of 19-year-old Melissa Koontz. He was convicted in July 1991 and sentenced to life in prison. His conviction hinged on the testimony of Donald "Goose" Johnston, an alcoholic and intellectually disabled person who falsely confessed to the crime and later identified McMillen as the killer in a plea deal that resulted in Johnson serving less than seven years in prison. McMillen was convicted by a jury based on the false testimony of Donald Johnston and was given a life sentence.

Gary Edgington was tried separately. He was also convicted and received a life sentence based on the testimony of Johnston. He is being represented by the Innocence Project in New York.

In 2008, a fingerprint on the car's rearview mirror was run through a database, and found to belong to none of the defendants, but a family friend, who said that he sometimes used the car, though he had not previously been identified as a suspect or investigated in the original case. In 2014 the Innocence Project used this and several other facts to ask for a reconsideration of Tom McMillan's case, but the Innocent Project website has no information about the results of this appeal.

=== Donald "Goose" Johnston ===
Four days after Melissa Koontz disappeared, Donald Johnston sees a missing person poster and tells a police officer he had seen the missing woman in Carlinville, Illinois, 46 miles from where she disappeared. This was the first of many false statements Johnston would make about the case. McMillen was denied access to Donald Johnston's mental health records by the court when his defense attorney requested the records. Johnston recanted his testimony in a video-recorded statement in 2008, and signed a medical authorization allowing for the release of his mental health records. These records show he has an IQ of 54. According to the U.S. Supreme Court, "These persons are a special risk of wrongful conviction." (Hall v. Florida).

Tom McMillen's defense attorney Michael Costello provided an affidavit as to the significance of Donald Johnston's mental health records. "Had the mental health records of Donald Johnston been disclosed prior to trial I would have challenged Donald Johnston's mental competency to testify."

Richard Leo is one of the nation's leading experts on the psychology of false confessions. He conducted a video-taped forensic interview of Donald Johnston in 2008. "In evaluating whether a witness is providing police with reliable information, a person who claims to have witnessed a murder should be able to accurately relate details to police that match up with the crime scene evidence. They should be able to provide facts of the crime that would not be generally known to the public. Based on my review of all available statements, Donald Johnston was never able to provide accurate details to police."

=== Danny Pocklington ===
Danny Pocklington was 15 years old when his cousin Donald Johnston told police that Pocklington was with him when Melissa Koontz was abducted and killed. Danny receives social security disability for intellectual disability since he was a teenager. He too, falsely confessed to the murder of Koontz. He served 6 years in a juvenile correctional facility until he turned 21. He brought a silver necklace to school and claimed it had been taken from Koontz. Police reports indicate the Koontz family was shown this silver necklace, but it did not belong to their daughter. There was no evidence at the time of the investigation that a silver necklace was missing. At autopsy the medical examiner removed a gold necklace that victim was wearing when her body was found. Pocklington provided another silver necklace to police claiming that he got it from Donald Johnston. Police failed to document whether this necklace had been shown to the family. Pocklington was mentally unfit to testify and was not called as a witness at the trials of McMillen or Edgington.

=== Mary Pocklington ===
The mother of Danny, she was charged with providing false statements to police. She is the one who gave police the silver necklace that she got from her son. This silver chain was offered as a key piece of evidence at trial corroborating the testimony of Donald Johnson. The mother of the victim testified that the silver chain was similar to one that her daughter had. However, she made this statement for the first time in court and never told police about her daughter having silver necklace.

=== Jamie Snow ===
This crime occurred in Bloomington, Illinois, on Easter Sunday 1991. The murderer walked away with approximately $90, as Jamie Snow ate dinner with his children. After several years without a clear suspect, Jamie Snow was arrested and improperly charged by police and prosecutors willing to convict him by any means necessary, even after passing a polygraph exam. The conviction was only possible using testimony of unreliable witnesses, many who had their own legal issues, people easily coerced into accepting deals, some more than willing to give false testimony. Jailhouse informants claimed that Snow "confessed" to them while awaiting trial. Many of which have now recanted their testimonies in sworn affidavits. There has never been any physical evidence tying Snow to this case. Information has also come forward that at least one jury member knew Snow and did not inform the court of same. Snow has spent the last 14 years in prison fighting to present new evidence demonstrating his innocence. The original trial violated his constitutional rights in several ways, many which stem from a lack of representation by his public defender, who presented little to no defense. Not surprisingly, this attorney has since been disbarred, yet Jamie's conviction remains. The Prosecution relied on one "star witness" who provided critical eye-witness identification. Yet this same witness was unable to identify Snow in photo books or during a line-up which occurred soon after the crime. It was not until 1999, eight years later and after Snow's arrest, that the "star witness" identified Snow upon seeing his photograph in a local newspaper. Only at the trial, 10 years after the fact, did the "star witness" speak of Snow's eyes being "unforgettable", yet he had seen Jamie in numerous close up photos and the in person line-up not long after the incident occurred. Approximately four years after conviction police radio tapes disclosed to Snow that "star witness" could not have seen what he testified to seeing. Snow has always maintained his innocence, and continues to do so. Snow is represented by Tara Thompson with The Exoneration Project.

Christopher Vaughn On June 14, 2007, Christopher Vaughn from Oswego, Illinois, loaded up the family vehicle and headed for Springfield, Illinois with his family to spend the day at Knight's Action Park. Just after 5 a.m., his wife asked him to pull off the highway because she was feeling sick, a side-effect of having stress related migraine headaches. A passing motorist stopped to render assistance to Christopher Vaughn, who was found walking along frontage road of Interstate 55 south of Joliet. He had been shot twice.

Their three children, Abigayle, 12, Cassandra, 11, and Blake, 8, were found dead in the rear passenger seat when paramedics arrived. Each had been shot twice. His wife, found in the front passenger seat of the family vehicle had a single gunshot wound under her chin. A 9 mm handgun belonging to her husband was found on the floorboard near Kimberly Vaughn's feet.

Vaughn initially told a man who stopped to render assistance that he believed he had been shot by his wife. However, when later interviewed by Illinois State Police investigators he had no memory of the incident. During the interview, he defended his wife and told investigators "she couldn't have done it ... She's not that type of person".

Vaughn was arrested on the morning of the funeral for his family. Probable cause to arrest Vaughn was based on blood stain interpretations that were later discredited by DNA testing.

A psychiatrist later explained that Vaughn may have been experiencing dissociative amnesia. This is a form of memory loss caused when a person witnesses a traumatic event like watching his entire family die in an automobile crash and being the sole survivor, according to the Diagnostic and Statistical Manual of Mental Disorders published by the American Academy of Psychiatric Association.

A forensic pathologist retained as an expert witness for the prosecutor later described Kimberly Vaughn's injuries as consistent with a self-inflicted gunshot wound when he was deposed prior to trial.

Vaughn faced the death penalty. More than a year after he was arrested, the Food and Drug Administration issued an alert in December 2008, warning that patients taking the prescription medication Topamax had a statistically significant risk of suicidal ideation and behavior. Kimberly Vaughn had been prescribed the medication Topamax for the treatment of stress related migraine headaches.

A week before her death, Kimberly Vaughn reported experiencing symptoms that the FDA would later identify as early warning signs of adverse side effects from the medication. On May 24, 2007, Kimberly Vaughn told her doctor that she was experiencing anxiety and a big change in her personality. Other family members reported witnessing agitation and an episode of a panic attack during a recent family outing.

Nearly two years later, on May 9, 2009, the FDA issued new warning labels and medication guides for Topamax. The warning label inserted into medications sold after that date advised patients to immediately call their health care provider if they are experiencing: "new or worse anxiety; feeling agitated or restless; panic attacks; new or worse irritability; other unusual changes in behavior or mood."

A state police crime scene investigator described how he was persuaded by his interpretation of the crime scene evidence that this was a case of murder-suicide committed by the wife during a deposition that was taken in the weeks before Gov. Quinn signed legislation abolishing the death penalty.

Former ISP Crime Scene Investigator Robert Deel said, "every time I would come up with something that the evidence would suggest or support or you would be able to at least follow the evidence to come to a logical conclusion, basically I was just given some other crazy way that this could have occurred or they would change their theory of what happened to try to match the evidence rather than letting the evidence dictate to you the events that occurred". Deel said he cautioned investigators to wait before leaping to any conclusions. However, after voicing his concerns, Deel was isolated from the investigation by the Will County State's Attorney's office.

"What he described was tunnel vision that infected the investigation of the Vaughn case", said Bill Clutter, who is director of investigations for the newly formed innocence project. Clutter was involved in the investigation that helped exonerate former death row inmates Randy Steidl, Rolando Cruz and Alejandro Hernandez. There were 20 men who were freed from death row in Illinois who were actually innocent. A Governor's Commission would later study the causes of why these men had been wrongfully convicted, and concluded that most of the cases had been plagued with tunnel vision. This is when police investigators leap to conclusions about a suspect's guilt, while disregarding evidence that points toward other suspects.

The Will County State's Attorney's office has been involved in other high-profile cases where it arrested and convicted the wrong person. Most notable is the case of Kevin Fox, a father who was mistakenly arrested in 2004 and convicted of the murder of his three-year-old daughter. More recently, a police officer was arrested as the alleged Honey Bee Killer in Will County, but charges were later dismissed after his alibi was corroborated.

A seminar called "Side-effects: Homicidal and Suicidal Behavior Influenced by Prescription Medications" was presented on February 18, 2013, at Chicago-Kent College of Law, featuring Dr. David Healy. A Wales physician, Healy was the first doctor to link suicidal and homicidal behavior as a side effect of some prescription medications. He was one of the experts hired to testify by Vaughn's defense team.

However, after the death penalty was abolished in Illinois the resources of the Capital Litigation Trust Fund were no longer available to help defend Vaughn. His defense team was discharged from the case in March 2011, after the Will County Board refused to provide funding for his defense team. The case was handed off to a new attorney, who refused pro bono assistance from a major law firm that had been recruited by Rob Warden of the Center on Wrongful Convictions based at Northwestern Law School. Vaughn was convicted eight months later, in August 2012.

Clutter's work on the Christopher Vaughn case was featured on a 12-part podcast by I Heart Radio called Murder in Illinois, and in an episode of Dr. Phil.

== Notable Members ==
Prominent Investigating Innocence members are exoneree Randy Steidl, exoneree Ray Krone, private investigator Paul J. Ciolino, Cyndy Short, a Kansas City attorney who recently freed Reggie Griffin, and attorney Jose Baez.

== See also ==
- List of wrongful convictions in the United States
