= Innocence Protection Act =

US law reforming death penalty

In United States federal criminal law, the Innocence Protection Act is the first federal death penalty reform to be enacted. The Act seeks to ensure the fair administration of the death penalty and minimize the risk of executing innocent people. The Innocence Protection Act of 2001, introduced in the Senate as S. 486 and the House of Representatives as H.R. 912, was included as Title IV of the omnibus Justice for All Act of 2004 (H.R. 5107), signed into law on October 30, 2004 by President George W. Bush as public law no. 108-405.

The Justice For All Act is the product of a bi-partisan, bicameral compromise led by then-Senate Judiciary Chairman Orrin Hatch (R-UT), Ranking Member Senator Patrick Leahy (D-VT), Sen. Arlen Specter (R-PA), then-House Judiciary Chairman F. James Sensenbrenner (R-WI) and Rep. William Delahunt (D-MA). It passed the House by an overwhelming vote of 393 to 14 on October 6, 2004 and the Senate by voice vote three days later.

The text of the Act amended the United States Code to include procedures for post-conviction DNA testing in federal court. Through the Kirk Bloodsworth Post-Conviction DNA Testing Program, the act established a federal grant program to provide money to states to defray the costs of post-conviction DNA testing. The program is named for the first man to be exonerated by use of post-conviction DNA testing. The act additionally contains provisions for increasing the quality of representation for indigent defendants in state capital cases, and for compensating victims of wrongful conviction.

== Death penalty ==
The Innocence Protection Act is the first federal death penalty reform to be enacted. The United States Supreme Court in 1972 suspended use of existing death penalty statutes because of inconsistencies in how they were applied. It ordered the states to pass new legislation to address it's concern, and affirmed a case in 1976 under new law, essentially allowing states to again sentence convicted persons to death under their laws. But by 2002, more than 100 people have been released from death rows across the United States after it was found that they were wrongfully convicted because of procedural errors or newly discovered evidence of their innocence.

The Innocence Protection Act is a first attempt in federal legislation to ensure that innocent people are not put to death. Thirty-six states and the federal government have enacted legislation that permits the courts to impose death as a criminal sentence. Of those thirty-six states, Texas executed the most inmates during 2009 with 24 executions. The total number of executions in the United States in 2009 was 52. In 2009, the total number of inmates serving a death sentence in the United States was 3,173. Many executions are delayed as inmates seek appeals to overturn sentences or convictions.

== Post-conviction DNA testing ==
Advances in science and in particular, DNA testing, have yielded more accurate forensic evidence. In some cases, post-conviction testing has helped innocent people establish that they were wrongfully convicted and to gain exonerations. In the process, comparisons to state and federal databases have sometimes led to identification of the perpetrators of such crimes. DNA testing is a predominant forensic technique which makes it possible to obtain conclusive results in cases in which previous testing, such as analysis of hair or fingerprints, had been inconclusive or flawed. Post-conviction testing has been requested not only in cases in which DNA testing was never done (because it did not exist as a practice before the late 1980s), and also in cases in which the more refined technology of the early 21st century may result in indisputable evidence.

The Innocence Protection Act allows convicted individuals access to DNA testing if they meet certain conditions, such as the possibility that testing could produce new material evidence that would raise a reasonable probability that the individual did not commit the offense. Among other restrictions, it limits new testing to evidence that was not previously tested and generally requires it to be done within 36 months of conviction. All fifty U.S. states have passed statutes related to access to post-conviction DNA testing. It may be harder for inmates to access DNA testing in some states and easier in other states.
