= Shareef Cousin =

African-American man from New Orleans wrongfully convicted of murder

- Born: 1979 (age 46–47); New Orleans, Louisiana, U.S.
- Known for: Former death row inmate who had his conviction overturned

Shareef Cousin (born 1979) is an African-American man from New Orleans who was convicted of the first-degree murder of Michael Gerardi in 1996 and sentenced to death as a juvenile in Louisiana. At age 17, he became the youngest condemned convict to be sent to death row in Louisiana, and one of the youngest in the United States.

Cousin was convicted of Gerardi's murder on the basis of three eyewitnesses. Two identified Cousin as part of a group three black male teenagers involved in the murder. The third witness, Connie Babin, identified Cousin as the triggerman. Cousin allegedly confessed to the murder to his friend, James Rowell, who agreed to become a witness for the prosecution. However, Rowell later claimed that he was coerced to falsely implicate Cousin in exchange for a reduced sentence on other charges. To rebut this claim, the prosecution had three witnesses, including Rowell's lawyer, testify. Rowell's lawyer said that Rowell had privately told him that Cousin had confessed to the murder.

Cousin's conviction was overturned on appeal since the prosecution had unfairly used hearsay evidence in closing arguments and withheld evidence that would've cast doubt on the reliability of Babin's identification of Cousin as the triggerman. The prosecution declined to retry Cousin for the murder. Cousin remained in prison for separate armed robbery convictions until 2005.

== Crime ==
On March 2, 1995, Michael Gerardi took a woman named Connie Babin on their first date to the Port of Call restaurant in the French Quarter of New Orleans. After dinner, the couple left the restaurant to return to Gerardi's vehicle parked around the corner. Three black teenage males approached the vehicle. Gerardi yelled at his date to run away, which she did. As she was running, she turned around and saw one of the teens shoot Gerardi in the face.

== Investigation ==
On March 28, 1995, the police arrested 16-year-old Shareef Cousin, a resident of the city. When the police came to arrest Cousin, he pointed out that they had gotten the date of the murder wrong on his arrest warrant. This would later used be used as evidence against him. A friend of Cousin, James Rowell, who was seeking leniency for charges he faced arising from several robberies, claimed that he had bragged about the murder. Police put Cousin in a line-up and Babin picked him out.

Cousin was suspected of being a part of a group of teenagers who were committing robberies in New Orleans. He was charged with other robberies. In September 1995, he pleaded guilty to two counts of armed robbery and sentenced to 20 years in prison.

== Trial ==
In 1996, Cousin went on trial for Gerardi's murder. Babin testified at trial that she was "absolutely positive" that she had seen Cousin commit the murder. Around the same time, a tour group was passing by when members of the tour said they saw three black teenage males fleeing the scene of the murder. Members of the tour group said they had seen the same teenagers on the street corner near the restaurant about 15 minutes before the shooting. A restaurant cook and a member of the tour group identified Cousin as one of the three teenagers.

James Rowell was also called to testify against Cousin. Rowell was expected to testify for the prosecution that Cousin had bragged about the murder to him. However, when Rowell took the stand, he denied having the conversation with Cousin and instead told the jury that he was only saying what his attorney and the district attorney told him to say, alleging they threatened him with a long jail sentence if he didn't give them Shareef. Rowell also alleged that the prosecutors told him to lie about whether or not he had a deal, noting they scheduled his own hearing so it would not take place until after Cousin's trial, in order to conceal the deal from the defense. In response, the prosecution called Rowell's lawyer and a police detective who was present for Rowell's deposition. Those witnesses testified to what Rowell had previously said.

Shareef's defense team presented four witnesses, including two Parks and Recreation supervisors, who testified that Cousin had played in a basketball game in another part of the city and was being driven home by his coach at the time the crime was committed. There was also video footage of Cousin playing in a basketball game during the time of the murder. The alibi witnesses testified that the game periods had run approximately 8 minutes. However, the prosecutor timed the periods of the games and found that the footage appeared to contradict their testimony. He also impeached them with prior statements in which they said that the game ended earlier than they later testified.

Cousin was convicted of first degree murder by the jury and sentenced to death.

== Misconduct allegations and appeal ==
After the trial, the defense uncovered a number of instances of misconduct by the prosecution. Among them was statement made by Connie Babin on the night of the murder where she explained to police that she did not get a good look at the gunman or his accomplices because of the distance and would not be able to identify him. She also said that she was not wearing her glasses on the night of the murder and could see only patterns and shapes. Other discrepancies also were revealed: She told police the shooter was "slightly shorter" than Gerardi; Cousin is 4 in. taller than the victim. The prosecutors did not disclose these statements to the defense. This information was crucial to the defense, as Babin's identification of Cousin was the only evidence linking him to the murder. The attorneys received the statement from an anonymous source. The prosecution withheld other witness statements from the defense. A local bird watcher witnessed the crime through his binoculars and took down a license plate number. He reported the tip through the Crime Stoppers tip line.

Evidence was also discovered that the prosecution may have taken steps to prevent a number of defense witnesses from testifying. The defense was unable to locate during the trial four witnesses whom it had planned to call to testify that Cousin had been with them at the time of the murder. It was later discovered that the prosecution instructed these witnesses to go to the district attorney's office and remain there for the duration of the trial. The location of those witnesses was not disclosed to Cousin or his attorney. Upon questioning, the prosecutor said that he had taken them there for their own comfort as it was hot outside. Time magazine reported that the trial took place during one of the coldest Januarys in New Orleans history.

Cousin filed an appeal, which reached the Louisiana Supreme Court, on the basis of the Brady violations, which is the failure of the prosecution to disclose potentially exculpatory evidence to the defense. His appeal also identified the improper use of the testimony of Rowell's attorney and the police officer. While the use of witnesses to impeach witness testimony is legal, it can only be used to show the credibility of the witness. The prosecutors in this case used their memory of Rowell's earlier statements to attempt to prove Shareef's guilt. Their statements were determined to be hearsay evidence and therefore should not have been allowed.

The hearsay violations and the withholding of evidence that cast doubt on Babin's identification of Cousin led to the Louisiana Supreme Court overturning his conviction in 1998. It ordered a new trial on the grounds that evidence was mishandled and improperly used by the prosecution. The supreme court referred to it as "a flagrant misuse" of evidence. A few months later, Harry Connick Sr., the DA at the time, decided to drop the case, citing lack of evidence to pursue it any further.

== Disciplinary Board ==
In June 2005, prosecutor Roger Jordan was disciplined by the Louisiana Supreme Court for his misconduct in Cousin's case. His license to practice law was suspended for three months. However, the suspension was deferred on condition of good conduct for one year.

According to defense attorney Clive Stafford Smith, Regina Small told him that her husband, Detective Anthony Small, who was involved in the Cousin case, had called the Crime Stoppers tip line to report Cousin after police had already identified the teen as a suspect. Regina claimed that this led to the arrest of the teen, after which her husband collected the $10,500 reward. Regina and Anthony Small were in the process of divorcing when Stafford Smith interviewed. Regina also claimed that her husband stole jewelry from crime scenes and doctored police supports. None of Regina's claims were mentioned in the civil suit later filed by Cousin.

== Civil suit ==
Cousin filed a civil suit against a number of employees of the police department and district attorney's office. He alleged a number of violations of his civil rights. He alleged that the prosecution withheld a number of exculpatory statements, coerced and intimidated Rowell, and took steps to prevent his own defense witnesses from testifying on his behalf by illegally detaining them. The courts ruled against him on the basis that prosecutors have absolute immunity.

== Aftermath ==
Cousin was paroled for his other robbery convictions in 2005. In 2008, Cousin was arrested in Georgia and charged with committing identity and credit card fraud while working as a legal clerk at the Southern Center for Human Rights. Cousin had been employed at the center by the organization's president, Stephen Bright. Cousin later pleaded guilty to these charges. He admitted to stealing Bright's identity to obtain credit cards in his name and go on a $42,000 spending spree. Cousin was sentenced to 10 years in prison, with three years to serve. He was released from prison on July 28, 2011.

== See also ==
- List of exonerated death row inmates
- List of wrongful convictions in the United States
