= Deadly Women =

American documentary TV series

- Genre: Documentary
- Starring: Candice DeLong (host)
- Narrated by: Marsha Crenshaw (mini-series); Lynnanne Zager (TV series)
- Country of origin: United States
- Original language: English
- No. of seasons: 14
- No. of episodes: 191 + TV Movie pilot (List of episodes)

Original release
- Network: Discovery Channel (mini-series); Investigation Discovery Channel (TV series)
- Release: February 8, 2005 – September 9, 2021

Deadly Women is an American true crime documentary television series produced by Beyond International Group and airing on the Investigation Discovery (ID) network.

The series focuses on murders committed by women. It is hosted by former FBI criminal profiler Candice DeLong and narrated by Lynnanne Zager.

Deadly Women was first broadcast in 2005 as a three-part miniseries under the subtitles "Obsession", "Greed", and "Revenge". It was revived as a regularly scheduled series and began airing on December 24, 2008. Two major changes were made: Lynnanne Zager replaced original narrator Marsha Crenshaw, and the number of cases in each episode was reduced from four to three. The episodes were also recorded and presented in a widescreen format. The series was canceled in 2021 after 14 seasons.

Dubbed versions are also produced. A Spanish-language version aired on Discovery en Español under the title Las Verdaderas Mujeres Asesinas (True Killer Women); an Italian language version airs on Real Time Italy under the title Donne mortali (a literal translation of the English title).

== Format ==
The series is filmed in Sydney, Australia and nearby suburbs, the subjects are played by Australian and/or New Zealand actresses. Each episode has a unifying theme such as jealousy, financial gain, mental illness, or crimes committed by teenagers or the elderly. The titles of the episodes reflect the theme. The stories are told through re-enactments and interviews.

Episodes also feature contributors in relevant fields (e.g. law enforcement, the law, the media, forensic medicine and medicine). Diane Fanning, M. William Phelps, Gregg Olsen, Wensley Clarkson, Joan Renner, and Dr. Janis Amatuzio have made multiple appearances. Occasionally, family or friends of the subject or their victims appear to add context and/or perspective.

At the end of each segment, the subject (and those playing her male and female coconspirators, if any) break the fourth wall and look directly at the camera as their fates are revealed. Beginning in the ninth season, photos of the actual subjects are also shown (usually mugshots taken following their arrests, or artist renditions of those subjects if they lived like from paintings before the days of modern photography).

== Seasons ==
Season	Episodes	Originally released		
Season	Episodes	First released	Last released	Network
Pilot		October 21, 2003		Discovery Channel
1	3	February 8, 2005	February 22, 2005	Discovery Channel
2	6	December 24, 2008	April 1, 2009	Investigation Discovery
3	13	September 21, 2009	February 1, 2010	Investigation Discovery
4	16	August 12, 2010	December 23, 2010	Investigation Discovery
5	21	July 22, 2011	January 27, 2012	Investigation Discovery
6	20	August 17, 2012	January 25, 2013	Investigation Discovery
7	20	July 19, 2013	November 29, 2013	Investigation Discovery
8	20	August 1, 2014	December 5, 2014	Investigation Discovery
9	13	August 7, 2015	November 6, 2015	Investigation Discovery
10	13	August 27, 2016	November 26, 2016	Investigation Discovery
11	13	September 1, 2017	November 24, 2017	Investigation Discovery
12	10	September 3, 2018	November 23, 2018	Investigation Discovery
13	10	August 22, 2019	October 24, 2019	Investigation Discovery
14	13	June 17, 2021	September 9, 2021	Investigation Discovery

== Episodes ==
=== Pilot (2003) ===
A 52-minute-long TV film narrated by Marsha Crenshaw served as the basic pilot to Deadly Women. It covered four cases of women throughout history who committed murders using poison.

No. overall	No. in season	Title	Directed by	Written by	Original release date
0	0	"Poisonous Women"	Chris Thorburn	Unknown	October 21, 2003
Between 1927 and 1954, Nannie Doss fatally poisoned four of her husbands, two of her children, her mother, one of her mothers-in-law, and two of her grandsons with arsenic. She received the nickname "The Giggling Granny" because she seemed to giggle when she confessed to the murders. Avoiding the death penalty because of her gender, she was sentenced to life in prison on May 17, 1955, and remained in prison until she died 10 years later, in 1965. In the United Kingdom during the early 1870s, Mary Ann Cotton murdered 21 people by arsenic poisoning, including three of her husbands, her mother, a lover, a friend, and 12 children, 11 of whom were her own. She was sentenced to death and executed by hanging on March 24, 1873. In 1996, at Veterans Affairs Medical Center in Northampton, Massachusetts, nurse Kristen Gilbert injected poison into six of her patients, killing four of them. She was sentenced to life in prison without parole on March 27, 2001, and served her sentence at Federal Medical Center, Carswell in Fort Worth, Texas. In Australia, Annmarie Hughes attempted to murder her husband using poison she made from her potted oleander plant. Remorseful, she turned herself into the police but was eventually acquitted because her husband did not die.

=== Season 1 (2005) ===
Each of the three original episodes covered cases of various groups of women who were united by the episode's central theme. These three episodes were narrated by Marsha Crenshaw.

No. overall	No. in season	Title	Directed by	Written by	Original release date
1	1	"Obsession"	Chris Thorburn	Unknown	February 8, 2005
Elizabeth Báthory was a Hungarian noblewoman in the 16th century. According to legend, Báthory murdered as many as 650 young women because she believed that bathing in their blood would preserve her youth. Báthory, who became known as the "Blood Countess", was imprisoned in 1609. In Romania during the 1920s and 1930s, Vera Renczi poisoned her husbands, lovers, and son with arsenic before placing their bodies in zinc-lined coffins in her wine cellar. In New Orleans during the early 19th century, French socialite Delphine LaLaurie beat, tortured, and performed medical experiments on enslaved people in the basement of her mansion. In the state of Washington, Linda Burfield Hazzard, a quack doctor and a self-proclaimed "fasting specialist", believed she could heal her patients through diets and starvation. Hazzard's practice of starvation resulted in the death of a visiting English heiress in 1911 and many others, including herself in 1938.
2	2	"Greed"	Chris Thorburn	Unknown	February 15, 2005
In the early 1900s on a farm in La Porte, Indiana, Norwegian immigrant Belle Gunness poisoned her boyfriends with strychnine before feeding their remains to the hogs. Gunness' motive was to collect life insurance, cash, and other valuables from her victims. Between 1907 and 1917 in Windsor, Connecticut, nursing home proprietor Amy Archer-Gilligan purchased life insurance policies on her elderly residents before poisoning them with arsenic. In Cordele, Georgia, in the 1960s, Janie Lou Gibbs poisoned her three sons, her grandson, and her husband with arsenic to collect life insurance. During the 1880s in Liverpool, sisters Catherine Flannagan and Margaret Higgins poisoned their family members with arsenic in an attempt to claim insurance payouts. The two sisters became known as "The Black Widows of Liverpool". Both were executed by hanging in 1884.
3	3	"Revenge"	Chris Thorburn	Unknown	February 22, 2005
In 2000, Katherine Knight stabbed her partner John Price before dismembering him and using parts of his body to cook a stew. Knight was later sentenced to life imprisonment without the possibility of parole, becoming the first woman in Australia to receive that sentence. Blanche Taylor Moore repeatedly poisoned her boyfriend, Raymond Reid, with arsenic. She was also suspected in the murder of her father, her mother-in-law, and her first husband, as well as the attempted murder of her second husband in 1989. She was sentenced to death in 1991. In 1955, bar hostess Ruth Ellis fatally shot her boyfriend, David Blakely, after he punched her in the stomach, causing a miscarriage. She was the last woman to be executed in the United Kingdom. Maria Gruber, Irene Leidolf, Stephanija Meyer, and Waltraud Wagner murdered at least 38 of their patients between 1983 and 1989 by morphine overdose or by forcing water into their lungs, basically drowning them in their hospital beds.

=== Season 2 (2008–09) ===
Deadly Women resumed production of Season 2 in 2008, with slight changes. A new narrator, Lynnanne Zager, was introduced; and each episode began to feature three cases instead of four.

No. overall	No. in season	Title	Directed by	Written by	Original release date
4	1	"Thrill Kills"	John Mavety	Paul Hawker	December 24, 2008
Melinda Loveless, Laurie Tackett, Hope Rippey, and Toni Lawrence – On January 10, 1992, Loveless, with the help of three other schoolgirls, kidnapped, tortured, and murdered 12-year-old Shanda Sharer in Madison, Indiana. Lawrence, the only one who refused to participate in the murder, was sentenced to 20 years but was released on parole on December 14, 2000. Rippey was sentenced to 60 years but was released on parole on April 28, 2006. Tackett, who also participated in the assault on Sharer, was sentenced to 60 years but was released on parole on January 11, 2018, the 26th anniversary of Sharer's death. Loveless, the one who orchestrated the murder, was sentenced to 60 years in prison but was released on parole on September 5, 2019. Brenda Spencer – On January 29, 1979, when she was 16 years old, Spencer opened fire on a schoolyard in San Diego, killing the principal and custodian and wounding eight children and a police officer. She told a reporter that she did it because "...she did not like Mondays..." (Note: The case inspired the song "I Don't Like Mondays" by Irish punk rock group The Boomtown Rats.) She was sentenced to 25 years to life in prison. Spencer has been denied parole at least four times. Tracey Wigginton – In 1989, Australia, Wigginton has an obsession with the occult that leads her to stab 47-year-old Edward Baldock, a stranger, 27 times with the purpose of drinking his blood. Wigginton was sentenced to life in prison but was released on parole on January 11, 2012.
5	2	"Fatal Attraction"	John Mavety	Paul Hawker	December 31, 2008
Diane Downs – On May 19, 1983, in Springfield, Oregon, Downs shot her three children, killing one of them. She was pursuing a romantic relationship with a married man who did not want children and refused to leave his wife. She was sentenced to life imprisonment. Martha Wise – In Medina County, Ohio, in 1925, Wise, who was mentally ill, poisoned more than a dozen of her family members with arsenic, killing three. She was sentenced to life in prison and died there in 1971. Valerie Parashumti and Jessica Stasinowsky – On December 18, 2006, in Perth, Australia, the couple drugged, bludgeoned, and fatally strangled their 16-year-old flatmate Stacey Mitchell. Both women pleaded guilty and were sentenced to 24 years in prison.
6	3	"Twisted Minds"	John Mavety	Paul Hawker	February 28, 2009
Sylvia Seegrist – Seegrist opened fire on shoppers in a Philadelphia-area mall on October 30, 1985, killing three people. She received three consecutive life sentences. Christina Marie Riggs – On November 4, 1997, in Sherwood, Arkansas, Riggs tried to kill her children by injecting them with potassium chloride. When the potassium chloride did not kill her son, she opted to suffocate her children instead. She then tried to commit suicide but survived. She was sentenced to death and executed on May 2, 2000. Bobbie Sue Dudley – In St. Petersburg, Florida, Dudley, a registered nurse, murdered 12 nursing home residents by overdosing them with insulin injections. She was found guilty of second-degree murder and was sentenced to 65 years in prison but died while serving her sentence.
7	4	"Dark Secrets"	John Mavety	Paul Hawker	March 8, 2009
Judy Buenoano – Over a 12-year period, the Starke, Florida, resident murdered her husband and son and attempted to murder a second husband to claim insurance policies that she had set up in advance. Despite claiming innocence, Buenoano was sentenced to death and executed in the electric chair in March 1998. Eugene Falleni – Falleni, a transgender man living under the name "Harry Crawford" in Sydney, killed his wife, Annie Birkett, in 1917, allegedly to keep his assigned gender at birth concealed. He also attempted to murder Birkett's son. He was sentenced to death in 1920 but was released from prison after 11 years and lived the rest of his life as a woman. Genene Anne Jones – In Kerrville, Texas, Jones, a pediatric nurse, killed as many as 46 infants between 1980 and 1982. She was originally given a 99-year sentence, but after the episode aired, she was re-sentenced to life in prison.
8	5	"Bad Medicine"	John Mavety	Paul Hawker	March 23, 2009
Beverley Allitt – In 1991, Allitt, a British nurse, murdered four children and injured five others by injecting them with insulin or potassium, causing cardiac arrest. In 1993, Allitt was sentenced to serve a minimum of 30 years in prison. UPDATE: In 2023, Allitt was seen before members of a mental health facility, wanting to be transferred to a mainstream prison. If so, she would be eligible for parole after six months. Stella Maudine Nickell – In 1986, Nickell, a Seattle-based nurse poisoned her husband Bruce and shopper Sue Snow by planting cyanide-laced pain-relief capsules on drugstore shelves in a plan to cash in her husband's life insurance policies. Nickell received a 90-year sentence. Kathleen Folbigg – Folbigg was convicted of suffocating four of her children between 1989 and 1999. She received a 30-year sentence. In 2023, she was pardoned after new evidence revealed she was innocent, and her conviction was overturned.
9	6	"Predators"	John Mavety	Paul Hawker	April 1, 2009
Aileen Carol Wuornos – Wuornos, a prostitute, shot and killed seven men in Florida between 1989 and 1990 to rob them. Wuornos was sentenced to death. She was executed in October 2002. Dorothea Puente ran a boarding home in Sacramento during the 1980s. Puente was accused of poisoning her victims, stealing their Social Security checks, then burying seven of their bodies in her backyard. Puente was sentenced to life in prison and maintained her innocence until her death on March 27, 2011. Anna Marie Hahn, a German immigrant, killed five Germans immigrants in Cincinnati during the 1930s. After poisoning her victims, Hahn proceeded to steal money from them. She was sentenced to death and was executed in the electric chair in December 1938.

=== Season 3 (2009–10) ===
No. overall	No. in season	Title	Directed by	Written by	Original release date
10	1	"Young Blood"	John Mavety	Unknown	September 21, 2009
Mary Bell – In Newcastle-upon-Tyne, Bell strangled four-year-old Martin Brown to death on May 25, 1968, one day before her own 11th birthday. Two months later, Bell murdered three-year-old Brian Howe with her friend Norma Bell, with whom she was unrelated. Norma was acquitted, but Mary was convicted and sentenced to life in prison. She was released in 1980 at age 23. Holly Harvey and Sandra Ketchum – In Fayetteville, Georgia, teenage couple Holly Harvey and Sandra Ketchum were forbidden from seeing one another by Holly's grandparents. Harvey resented her grandparents, and with the help of Ketchum, stabbed them to death on August 2, 2004. Harvey was sentenced to 2 consecutive life sentences with a non-parole period of 20 years. Ketchum was sentenced to three concurrent life terms. Paula Cooper – In 1985 in Gary, Indiana, Cooper and her friends robbed 78-year-old Bible teacher Ruth Pelke under the pretense of asking for Bible lessons. When Pelke allowed the girls into her home, Cooper stabbed Pelke to death. Cooper was sentenced to death but later had her sentence commuted to 60 years in prison. On May 26, 2015, nearly two years after being released, Cooper committed suicide.
11	2	"Blood for Money"	John Mavety	Unknown	September 28, 2009
Eva Coo and Martha Clift – In 1934, Coo and Clift drove Henry Wright, a disabled coworker, to an isolated location in Oneonta, New York. There, Coo bludgeoned him with a mallet, and Clift ran over him with a car. Their motive was to collect Wright's life insurance. Clift was allowed to plead guilty to second degree murder, in exchange for testifying against Coo. She was sentenced to twenty years in prison. Coo was executed by the electric chair in August 1935. Celeste Beard – In Austin, Texas, Beard manipulated her lover Tracey Tarlton into murdering her husband Steven Beard, a retired television executive, in order to get his $12 million fortune. Celeste Beard, who maintained her innocence, will be eligible for parole in 2042. Tarlton took a plea deal and was released in 2011. Sarah Makin – In Australia during the 19th century, Sarah and her husband, John, murdered infants while collecting money from the children's mothers, relocating often to avoid detection. John was hanged, while Sarah was sentenced to life in prison. She was released in 1911 and died in 1918.
12	3	"The Disturbed"	Unknown	Unknown	October 5, 2009
Jane Toppan – Toppan was a nurse in Cambridge, Massachusetts, who murdered at least 31 of her patients for sexual pleasure. In 1902, she was found not guilty by reason of insanity and was committed to an insane asylum. Dana Sue Gray – In 1994, Gray killed three women and severely injured another in Chowchilla, California. She was sentenced to life without parole. Christine Falling – From 1980 to 1982 in Perry, Florida, Falling, a 17-year-old babysitter, suffocated children that she was hired to care for. She was sentenced to life without parole for at least 25 years.
13	4	"Behind the Mask"	James Knox	Unknown	October 12, 2009
Helen Golay and Olga Rutterschmidt – Golay and Rutterschmidt, two Hungarian immigrants in their 70s, killed two homeless men for insurance money in Santa Monica, California. Both women are serving life without parole. Betty Lou Beets – In Gun Barrel City, Texas, Beets murdered two of her husbands before burying them in her yard. She attempted to kill two more. She was executed on February 24, 2000. Kimberly "Kim" Michelle Hricko – In 1998, while Hricko was living in Talbot County, Maryland, she set her husband on fire in order to hide her affair with another man. She was sentenced to life without parole plus thirty years in prison.
14	5	"Forbidden Love"	James Knox	Unknown	October 19, 2009
Jasmine Richardson – In Medicine Hat, Alberta, "J.R.", age 12, and her 23-year-old boyfriend, Jeremy Steinke, killed her parents and brother in order to run away together. (Note: The Canadian Juvenile Law prohibits the use of a juvenile offender's real name in print. Subsequent articles, including some linked here, do reveal their full names. Each of the juvenile perpetrators in this story received the maximum sentences allowed under Canadian Law: 10 years.) J.R. was given a ten-year sentence and was released in 2016. Steinke was given three concurrent life sentences with a minimum of 25 years. Sharee Miller – Miller, a businesswoman from Flint, Michigan, used the Internet as a tool to manipulate her lover, police officer Jerry Cassaday, into killing her husband Bruce in 1999. Cassaday died by suicide but left evidence against Miller for the police to find before he did so. In December of 2000, Miller was sentenced to life without parole. Although she won a new trial that ended with her release in 2009, a judge reversed the decision and sent her back to prison in 2012. Kristin Rossum – In 2000, Rossum, a Memphis, Tennessee-based toxicologist, murdered her husband in order to hide her affair with her boss and an addiction to crystal meth, staging the murder as a scene from the film American Beauty. She is serving life without parole.
15	6	"Hearts of Darkness"	James Knox	Unknown	October 26, 2009
Winnie Ruth Judd – In 1931, Judd murdered her friends after fighting over a man, Jack Halloran. She cut them up with the intention of dumping their remains in the Pacific Ocean. Some speculate Halloran helped her dismember the friends. She died in 1998 after being released in 1971. Carolyn Warmus – In 1989, Warmus had an affair with Paul Solomon, who was already married. As Solomon refused to divorce his wife, she shot his wife nine times. Warmus was sentenced to 25 years to life. She was released from prison in June 2019. Daphne Antranette Wright – In Sioux Falls, South Dakota, Wright, a deaf woman, suffocated another deaf woman, Darlene VanderGiesen, and dismembered her with a chainsaw after she wrongly suspected that VanderGiesen was in a relationship with Wright's ex-girlfriend, Sallie Collins, in 2006. She received a life sentence without parole on April 17, 2007. VanderGiesen's family has since forgiven Wright for her crime, despite Wright remaining completely remorseless about her crime.
16	7	"Evil Influence"	Unknown	Unknown	November 2, 2009
Myra Hindley – Hindley and boyfriend Ian Brady murdered five children, burying their victims in the English moors. The couple was sentenced to life in prison. Hindley died in prison on November 15, 2002. Brady died in prison in 2017. Susan Atkins, Patricia Krenwinkel, and Leslie Van Houten – In August 1969, three disciples of cult leader Charles Manson killed seven people, including pregnant actress Sharon Tate and heiress Abigail Folger. Initially sentenced to death, the group's sentences were commuted to life in prison. Manson died in prison on November 19, 2017. Susan Atkins died on September 24, 2009. On July of 2023, Van Houten was released on parole, while Krenwinkel has been denied parole. Tania Herman – In 2005 in Australia, Herman killed Maria Korp, the wife of her lover Joe Korp, upon Joe's request. Herman was released from prison on February 14, 2014.
17	8	"Fatal Obsession"	Unknown	Unknown	November 9, 2009
Lisa Marie Montgomery – In 2004 in Melvern, Kansas, Montgomery faked a pregnancy. To avoid being exposed, she murdered a pregnant woman so she could steal the unborn baby. The baby girl survived and was returned to her father when police caught Montgomery the next day at her home. Montgomery was sentenced to death and executed by lethal injection on January 13, 2021. Pauline Parker and Juliet Hulme – Best friends Parker and Hulme killed Parker's mother in Christchurch, New Zealand, in 1954. They were arrested, but since they were too young to face the death penalty, they each served five years and were released separately. Catherine Birnie and her husband David murdered four people in 1986. Both were sentenced to four terms of life imprisonment. David died in 2005.
18	9	"Lethal Lovers"	Unknown	Unknown	November 16, 2009
Rosemary West – In a period spanning almost thirty years, West and her husband Fred raped, tortured, and murdered at least eleven women in the United Kingdom before burying them under their backyard. Fred died by suicide, while Rosemary was sentenced to life in prison. Martha Beck – On Long Island, Beck helped her boyfriend kill two women and a toddler. She was executed in the electric chair in 1951, requiring four applications of electricity before she was pronounced dead. Erika Grace Sifrit – While in Ocean City, Maryland, Erika and her husband Benjamin invited tourists Joshua Ford and Geney Crutchley back to her condo, where they murdered them. Erika was sentenced to life in prison plus twenty years, and Benjamin was sentenced to thirty-eight years. The two of them divorced in 2010, and as of March 2026, both were denied parole. The next hearing is set for 2030.
19	10	"Mothers Who Kill"	James Knox	Unknown	November 23, 2009
Waneta Hoyt – In Richford, New York, Hoyt killed her babies and blamed SIDS for the deaths to gain sympathy from other people. Later in her life, she confessed to the murders and was sentenced to 75 years to life in prison, dying in prison in 1998. Andrea Yates – Driven by postpartum psychosis, Yates drowned her five children in 2001. She was originally sentenced to life in prison, but at her second trial, she was found not guilty by reason of insanity. She was admitted to a Texas mental health facility. In Union County, South Carolina, Susan Smith drowned her toddler sons, Michael and Alexander, by rolling her minivan into a lake with them strapped to their seats, because her lover did not want children. Smith pretended that her children were kidnapped for nine days. She received a life sentence with the possibility of parole after serving thirty years. On November 20, 2024, she was denied her first application for parole.
20	11	"Born Bad"	James Knox	Unknown	November 30, 2009
Gertrude Baniszewski – In 1965 in Indianapolis, Indiana, Bansizewski tortured and murdered 16-year-old Sylvia Likens and got her children to help. She received a life sentence but was paroled after serving 20 years. Bansizewski died of cancer in 1990. In 1995, New Orleans police officer Antoinette Renee Frank, along with her boyfriend, Rogers Lacaze, shot another officer and two owners of a Vietnamese restaurant that Frank helped guard at night. She was also a suspect in the death of her father. Frank and Lacaze both received death sentences, though Lacaze's death sentence was commuted to life without parole in December 2019. Sharon Kinne killed her husband, a lover's wife, and a lover in Independence, Missouri. Sentenced to 10 years, Kinne escaped from a Mexican prison in 1969. She died in Canada in 2022 under an alias.
21	12	"Lethal Vengeance"	James Knox	Unknown	December 5, 2009
In 2003 in Bellevue, Idaho, sixteen-year-old Sarah Marie Johnson fatally shot her parents, Alan and Diane, when they forbade her from seeing her nineteen-year-old undocumented boyfriend, Bruno Santos. She was tried as an adult for two counts of first-degree murder and received two life sentences, both without parole, and both to be permanently upheld after exhausting all of her appeals. In Richmond, Virginia, forty-year-old Piper Rountree fatally shot her ex-husband Fred on October 28, 2004. She was sentenced to life in prison for first-degree murder. In Knoxville, Tennessee, eighteen-year-old Job Corps student Christa Pike believed that her classmate, Colleen Slemmer, was trying to date her boyfriend, Tadaryl Shipp. On January 13, 1995, Pike, Shipp, and their friend, Shadolla Peterson, lured Slemmer into the woods, where Pike began to torture her using a boxcutter. Pike then hit Slemmer in the head with a piece of asphalt, killing her, and kept a piece of her skull as a trophy. For testifying against the others, Peterson got a six-year suspended sentence. Shipp received life in prison with the possibility of parole after thirty years, though his first bid was denied on October 20, 2025, and he will not be eligible again until 2030. Pike was sentenced to death, becoming Tennessee's youngest death row inmate, and is set to be executed on September 30, 2026, after exhausting all of her appeals.
22	13	"Blood Lines"	James Knox & John Mavety	Unknown	February 1, 2010
Barbara Opel – Opel talked children (including her own daughter, Heather) into murdering an elderly man in 2001. Heather was sentenced to 22 years, with eligibility for parole in 2023 at the age of 36. A reduction of her sentence resulted in her being released early on a four-year period of probation in April of 2022. Barbara faced a death sentence, but the jury sentenced her to life without parole. Kate Bender helped her family members kill and rob lodgers. It is unknown what happened to the Bender family. Sante Kimes, a grifter, convinced her son, Kenny, to go on a murderous crime spree with her in Oklahoma City. Sante was sentenced to 125 years in prison. and Kenny was sentenced to 120 years. Sante died in prison on May 19, 2014.

=== Season 4 (2010) ===
No. overall	No. in season	Title	Directed by	Written by	Original release date
23	1	"An Eye for an Eye"	James Knox	Unknown	August 12, 2010
In Houston, Texas, Karla Faye Tucker used a pickaxe to murder her friend Shawn's abusive boyfriend, Jerry Dean, and a woman with whom he was having a one-night stand, Deborah Thornton, with help from her boyfriend, Danny Garrett. Upon being sentenced to death, she experienced a spiritual change. Pope John Paul II requested her sentence be commuted to life in prison without the possibility of parole. Then-Governor George W. Bush refused, thus making her execution, which was carried out in February 3, 1998, one of the most controversial in United States history. Jessica McCord, who suffered from borderline personality disorder and narcissistic personality disorder, lured her ex-husband, Alan Bates, and his new wife, Terra, into a trap, where her current husband, Jeff, shot them both in February, 2002, in Hoover, Alabama. Jessica and Jeff were both given life sentences. While Jeff has the possibility of parole (though his first bid was denied in 2017), Jessica, as the mastermind, does not. Colombia-born Clara Harris attacked her husband, David, and his mistress, Gail Bridges, in Nassau Bay, Texas, on July 24, 2002, at a four-star hotel. She ran him over with her car in the parking lot, with the crime witnessed by her stepdaughter, Lindsey. She was sentenced to twenty years and a $10,000 fine, but was released from prison on May 11, 2018.
24	2	"Outlaws"	James Knox	Unknown	August 19, 2010
Griselda Blanco was a drug lord who had roughly 100 people murdered during the Miami drug war. On one occasion, she put a contract on one of her hitmen, which resulted in the killing his two-year-old son instead of the hitman in a drive-by shooting. Blanco received a 10-year prison sentence. She was killed in a drive-by shooting on September 3, 2012. Barbara Graham was a prostitute and heroin addict, she was desperate for cash when she was introduced to her other partners at a private bar. During what was supposed to be a robbery, she pistol-whipped widow Mabel Monohan to death in Oakland, California. She was executed in the gas chamber in 1955. Juanita Spinelli fostered young teenagers and taught them to become her henchmen in her own crime ring, including her own daughter. When they accidentally killed an innocent man, she murdered one of them to prevent him from going to the police. Spinelli was executed in 1941 at the age of 52.
25	3	"Fortune Hunters"	James Knox	Unknown	August 26, 2010
Jill Coit of Steamboat Springs, Colorado, was a young conwoman who married hardware store owner Gerry Boggs. When Boggs, with help from his brother, Doug, discovered her troublesome past, he annulled the marriage, which placed a target on his back. With the help of her next husband, Michael Backus, Jill hit him with a stun gun and a shovel before shooting him repeatedly. Both were sentenced to life without parole. On September 8, 2004, stripper-turned-housewife Marjorie Ann Orbin shot and dismembered her husband, Jay, in Phoenix, Arizona, right on his forty-fifth birthday, and then disposed of his body in the desert, all for his life insurance policy of $1,500,000. She faced a death sentence, but instead received life without parole. Suffering from anxiety disorder, Barbara Stager of Durham, North Carolina, shot and killed her sleeping husband, Russell, on February 1, 1988. A recording made by Russell three days before his murder, along with the rest of the evidence, cinches the case for investigators. Barbara was sentenced to death, but had her sentence commuted to life. She was denied parole in 2005, March 2009, 2012, 2015, and again on February 1, 2018, the thirty-year anniversary of Russell's murder.
26	4	"Dangerous Liaisons"	Unknown	Unknown	September 2, 2010
Caril Ann Fugate and her boyfriend, Charles Starkweather, killed 11 people. It was disputed whether she was an accomplice or was taken hostage by Starkweather, as she claimed to be. Fugate received a life sentence and Starkweather was executed in the electric chair in 1959. Valmae Beck and her husband Barrie Watts abducted, raped, and murdered 12-year-old Sian Kingi in Noosa, Queensland. Beck received a life sentence, but died in 2008. As of 2023, Watts is serving two life sentences without parole. Ashley Christine Humphrey stalked and killed her husband, Tracey's, ex-girlfriend, Sandee, to prevent her from pressing rape charges against him in Pinellas Park, Florida. Ashley was found guilty of second-degree murder and was sentenced to twenty-five years, while Tracey received life in prison without parole.
27	5	"Till Death Do Us Part"	Unknown	Unknown	September 9, 2010
Mary Winkler shot her sleeping husband, a preacher, in Selmer, Tennessee, claiming she was subjected to physical, sexual, and emotional abuse. Her divisive trial gained national attention. She was charged with manslaughter. Now released, she has full custody of her three daughters. Rebecca Salcedo married a rich man for his money. After learning she would only receive a few thousand dollars by divorcing him, she killed him. Salcedo was sentenced to life in prison. When Betty Broderick of Eastchester, New York, discovered her husband, Dan, was having an affair, he divorced her, gaining custody of their four kids. Broderick shot and killed Dan and his new wife. Found guilty of second-degree murder, she was sentenced to thirty-two years to life. She was denied parole in November 2011 and again in January 2017. She would have been eligible for parole again in January 2032, but she died in prison on May 8, 2026.
28	6	"Master Manipulators"	Unknown	Unknown	September 16, 2010
Sharon Nelson talked her lover into killing her husband, then pursued a relationship with a third man. Nelson was sentenced to life in prison and died in 2017. Virginia Larzelere hired a hitman to shoot her husband in his dental office at midday. She was sentenced to death in 1993, but in August 2008, her sentence was commuted to life in prison. Sheila LaBarre, after inheriting her husband's farm in Epping, New Hampshire, seduced and killed at least two men. LaBarre's plea of not guilty by reason of insanity was rejected, and she received two life sentences without parole. She was suspected of having killed more men than her two known victims.
29	7	"The Sacred Bond"	James Knox	Unknown	September 23, 2010
Theresa Jimmie Francine Knorr – In Sacramento, California, Knorr suffered from delusions which led her to kill two of her daughters. Detectives did not believe the story as told by her surviving daughter, Terry, until it was confirmed by two additional cases. Knorr is currently serving two life sentences. Terry Knorr died in December 2011. Debora Green set her Prairie Village house on fire and killed two of her three children to get back at her husband for leaving her. Green received a life sentence, and will be eligible for parole at the age of 84. Diane O'Dell of Safford, Arizona, smothered three of her infants to death and placed their bodies in boxes. O'Dell was sentenced to life in prison with the possibility of parole.
30	8	"Beyond Suspicion"	James Knox	Unknown	September 30, 2010
Tillie Gburek worked as a fortune teller in Chicago who predicted when people would die. To make her predictions come true, she poisoned her clients with arsenic. She was arrested and found guilty for the murder of her third husband, dying in prison in 1936. Beth Carpenter of East Lyme, Connecticut, aided by her boss, hired a hitman to kill her sister Kim's partner, Buzz, for $5,000. Carpenter received life with no chance of parole. Caroline Grills inherited her mother-in-law's house by poisoning her with thallium, then proceeded to kill two more of her relatives. She was sentenced to life imprisonment and died in 1960.
31	9	"In Cold Blood"	James Knox	Unknown	October 7, 2010
Wendi Mae Davidson killed her husband by injecting him with drugs that were normally used to euthanize animals. Despite claiming innocence, she was sentenced to 25 years in prison. In 1997, Australian law student Anu Singh hosted a dinner party, where she drugged her fiancé, Joe, with rohypnol. She injected him with heroin the next day, killing him. Singh was sentenced to 10 years in prison, but was released early in 2001. Lynn Turner married a police officer and a firefighter while working as a dispatcher. She killed them both by poisoning them with ethylene glycol-based antifreeze hidden in a bowl of gelatin. Turner died in prison on August 30, 2010, from an apparent suicide by poison.
32	10	"Under His Control"	Unknown	Unknown	October 21, 2010
Jennifer Reali met a man who convinced her to murder his wife, telling Reali that the murder was a mercy killing because his wife had lupus. She received a life sentence which was commuted in 2011, making her eligible for parole. In December 2017, she was granted parole, but died of pancreatic cancer in March 2018. Bonnie Heady, alongside her boyfriend Carl Austin Hall, abducted a six-year-old boy in Kansas City, Missouri, and held him for $600,000 ransom. After his parents sent the money, they killed the boy to prevent him from revealing their identities. Both were arrested and executed in the gas chamber in 1953. In Poughkeepsie, New York, Fred Andros convinced his lover Dawn Silvernail to kill a woman he had coerced her into having sex with. Andros was found guilty of second-degree murder and was sentenced to 25 years to life. He died in prison. Silvernail was found guilty of second-degree murder and sentenced to 18 years to life. She was released from prison in 2017 and died in April 2020.
33	11	"Secrets and Lies"	James Knox	Unknown	October 28, 2010
Restaurateur Anjette Lyles from Macon, Georgia, used arsenic to fatally poison two of her husbands, a mother-in-law, and her daughter. Anjette was sentenced to death, but was later committed to an insane asylum, where she died of a heart attack in 1977. Susan Grund was accused of the shooting death of her husband, Jimmy, and sentenced to 60 years. There is still a dispute as to the perpetrator's identity. Audrey Marie Hilley secretly used arsenic to kill her husband in Anniston, Alabama. Following the murder, Hilley moved to a different area and used two different pseudonyms; she remained undetected for years, dying in 1987.
34	12	"Love Gone Wrong"	Unknown	Unknown	November 4, 2010
Accompanied by her boyfriend Christopher Snider, Christine Paolilla murdered her four best friends in Houston on July 18, 2003, and remained on the loose for three years. During that time, she was reportedly haunted by her murdered friends. She faced the death penalty, but since she was 17, she received 40 years to life with the possibility of parole. Penny Boudreau, a resident of Clark's Harbour, constantly argued with her 12-year-old daughter Karissa. Boudreau strangled her on January 27, 2008. Found guilty of second-degree murder, she received a 20-year sentence. She was granted an escorted furlough in 2018. Jennifer Hyatte fell in love with prisoner George Hyatte while working as a nurse in Kingston, Tennessee, and married him. After George's latest parole hearing, she showed up at the courthouse with a gun and killed prison guard Wayne "Cotton" Morgan to free her husband. Both faced the death penalty, but pleaded guilty and were sentenced to life without parole.
35	13	"A Daughter's Revenge"	Unknown	Unknown	November 11, 2010
In Nashua, New Hampshire, student Nicole Kasinskas and her boyfriend bludgeoned and stabbed her mother to death after being denied permission to live with him. She was sentenced to 40 years in prison while her boyfriend was sentenced to life without parole. Constance Kent slit the throat of her half-brother, Francis, in response to her father cheating on her dying mother with the governess, Mary. Kent confessed to a priest and was sentenced to death, but was later commuted to life in prison. She was released in 1885 and dedicated her life to religion. She died at the age of 100. After Belinda Van Krevel's brother Mark was arrested for murdering two people, they blamed their father Jack by accusing him of sexual assault when they were children. When her brother received a life sentence, Belinda convinced her brother's best friend, Keith Schreiber, to kill Jack in Wollongong, New South Wales. Belinda was sentenced to imprisonment for six years, but was released after serving three. In July 2013, she was arrested and sent to prison again for stabbing her boyfriend.
36	14	"Love Sick"	Unknown	Unknown	December 9, 2010
Lisa Michelle Lambert stalked and eventually killed Laurie Show in Lancaster, Pennsylvania. Lisa was found guilty of first-degree murder and was sentenced to life in prison without parole. Daphne Abdela lived near The Dakota in New York City and began drinking at 15 years old. Alongside her boyfriend, Christopher Vasquez, she repeatedly stabbed a man they knew and dumped him near the Strawberry Fields memorial in Central Park. Daphne pled guilty to manslaughter and served 10 years in jail. Sarah Kolb befriended Adrianne Reynolds in East Moline, Illinois, but when both girls were interested in the same boy, Sarah murdered Adrianne, having a friend chop up and burn the body. Kolb received 48 years for murder and five years for concealment.
37	15	"Married to Murder"	Unknown	Unknown	December 16, 2010
Amy Bosley, caught embezzling millions of dollars in Campbell County, Kentucky, killed her husband and staged a break-in while hiding the money. She was caught and sentenced to life in prison, but was released in May 2022. Joyce Chant shot and chopped up her abusive husband in Revesby, New South Wales. She received a three-year prison sentence after pleading guilty at trial. In Morgantown, West Virginia, Michelle Michael murdered her husband Jimmy after he discovered she was having an affair. She received a life sentence for the crime.
38	16	"Teen Killers"	Unknown	Unknown	December 23, 2010
Chelsea Richardson and Susanna Toledano – Toledano killed the parents of Richardson's boyfriend, Andrew Wamsley, so the three would inherit the family's property in Mansfield, Texas. Susanna testified against Wamsley and Richardson, receiving a 30-year sentence with the possibility of parole. Wamsley received a life sentence; barring a successful appeal, he will be eligible for parole. Richardson was sentenced to death, but in December 2011, her sentence was commuted to life in prison. Sandra and Beth Andersen drugged their mother and drowned her in the bathtub for her money. Both women have served their prison sentences. After fantasizing what it would be like to shoot someone, Penny Bjorkland from Daly City, California, killed a man who offered her a ride. She was released from prison in the mid-1960s.

=== Season 5 (2011–12) ===
No. overall	No. in season	Title	Directed by	Written by	Original release date
39	0	"Deadly Women: Killer Countdown Special"	Unknown	Unknown	July 22, 2011
FBI profiler Candice DeLong counts down the "10 Deadliest Women" featured on the show in seasons 2–4, as determined by viewer votes on Investigation Discovery's website. The special featured clips from each Deadly Women episode. The results were as follows: #10 Myra Hindley, #9 Caril Ann Fugate, #8 Lisa M. Montgomery, #7 Christa Pike, #6 Sarah Makin, #5 Betty Lou Beets, #4 Rosemary West, #3 Griselda Blanco, #2 "J.R."/Jasmine Richardson, and #1 Gertrude Baniszewski.
40	1	"Twisted Thrills"	Unknown	Unknown	July 29, 2011
Fayetteville, North Carolina, gang leader Christina Walters kidnapped three women in two separate abductions and shot them; one of the victims survived. Walters was sentenced to death, and in December 2012, her death sentence was commuted to life in prison without the possibility of parole. Judith Neelley and her husband Alvin went on a crime spree. After being released on armed robbery charges, Judith and Alvin abducted, raped, tortured, and murdered two people. Judith was sentenced to death, which later was commuted to life. Alvin died in prison in 2005. Irene Maslin killed her friend's boyfriend with battery acid, a baseball bat, and suffocation with a grocery bag. Maslin was released from prison after serving 15 years and later died in 2010.
41	2	"Loathe Thy Neighbor"	Unknown	Unknown	August 5, 2011
Tiffany Cole, alongside her boyfriend, Michael Jackson, and friends, Bruce Nixon and Alan Wade, robbed, kidnapped, and buried an elderly couple, Reggie and Carol Sumner, alive in Jacksonville, Florida. Upon their arrest and conviction, Jackson, Cole, and Wade were all sentenced to death, while Nixon, who agreed to assist the police, was sentenced to forty-five years. On August 23, 2023, Cole's sentence was commuted to life without parole. In an attempt to join the Bloods, Shonda Dee Walter killed Pearl Harbor survivor James Sementelli with a hatchet on March 23, 2003, in Lock Haven, Pennsylvania. She received a death sentence, but in August 2016, her sentence was commuted to life without parole. On March 27, 2009, bipolar Sunday school teacher Melissa Huckaby drugged eight-year-old Sandra Cantu, her daughter's friend, raped her with a rolling pin, and smothered her to death in Tracy, California. She faced a death sentence, but pleaded guilty and was sentenced to life without parole.
42	3	"Hearts of Stone"	Unknown	Unknown	August 12, 2011
Lydia Sherman laced food and drinks with arsenic in Burlington, New Jersey, killing three husbands and all of her children. She was given a life sentence. Paula Sims murdered her two daughters in Brighton, Illinois, but let her son live due to her personal view that the girls were unwanted. Sims was granted clemency by Illinois Governor JB Pritzker in March 2021, changing her sentence from life without the possibility of parole to life with the possibility of parole. She was granted parole in October 2021. During the 1970s, Velma Barfield masqueraded as a caretaker while killing people with arsenic, with two husbands as her first victims. Sentenced to death, she received the nickname "angel of death row" before her execution in November 1984.
43	4	"Kill Their Own"	Unknown	Unknown	August 19, 2011
Darlie Routier, a housewife from Rowlett, Texas, fatally stabbed two of her sons and staged a break-in. To date, Routier maintains her innocence in the crime, attributing it to an unidentified intruder. In 1987, Frances Elaine Newton shot her husband and her two young children for their life insurance money. Susan Diane Eubanks of San Marcos, California, sought revenge against her ex-husbands by shooting and killing her four sons. All three women were sentenced to death. However, as of 2024, all three women received different fates. Routier still awaits execution on Texas's death row, and Newton was executed in September 2005 by the State of Texas. Eubanks, meanwhile, was resentenced to life in prison without parole in 2024.
44	5	"To Love and to Murder"	Unknown	Unknown	August 26, 2011
Louise Peete shot and killed multiple partners and a woman before being executed in the gas chamber in 1947. Instead of divorce, horse owner Jane Dorotik chose to murder her husband so she would not have to share the money she planned to use for her own ranch. Dorotik served a 25-year sentence before being released in 2020. In March 2022, a new trial was ordered, ending with the charges against her being dropped. Teresa Lewis and her two lovers, Matthew Shallenberger and Rodney Fuller, shot her husband and his son for life insurance in Danville, Virginia. Shallenberger and Fuller were sentenced to life, with Shallenberger later committing suicide. Lewis was executed by the State of Virginia on September 23, 2010.
45	6	"Kill for Cash"	Unknown	Unknown	September 2, 2011
In order to kill her father through a hitman, Marjorie Diehl-Armstrong coerced innocent pizza deliveryman Brian Wells to rob a bank for her with a bomb strapped around his neck, but the bomb turned out to be real and went off, killing him. Armstrong was sentenced to life without parole and died in prison on April 4, 2017. Rosie Alfaro stabbed her friend's nine-year-old sister, Autumn Wallace, over 50 times in Anaheim, California, to rob the house and then trade the items and money stolen in exchange for drugs and alcohol. She was sentenced to death. To inherit her neighbors' farm in Nowra, New South Wales, Kim Snibson murdered the couple who was living there. She was sentenced to 32 years, 24 of which she would be ineligible for parole.
46	7	"Breaking Point"	Unknown	Unknown	September 9, 2011
In December 2008, Amber Cummings, a woman from Belfast, Maine, shot her abusive husband, James, to save her daughter, Claira, from being sexually assaulted. Afterwards, the authorities discovered that James had been planning a terrorist attack at the 2009 inauguration of Barack Obama. Cummings served no time in prison. In London, England, maid and thief Katherine "Kate" Webster murdered her employer, Julia Martha Thomas, on January 13, 1879, and disposed of the body by dismembering and boiling it. She was executed by hanging. Thomas's skull was found in 2010 by workmen doing excavation work of the former Mayfield Cottages. In Maricopa, Arizona, Wendi Elizabeth Andriano killed her terminally ill husband, Joe, on October 8, 2000, to obtain his life insurance money. She was sentenced to death and continues to await execution after exhausting all her appeals.
47	8	"Love to Death"	Unknown	Unknown	September 16, 2011
In Gaithersburg, Maryland, voodoo and black magic practitioner Josephine Gray killed three husbands (and nearly a fourth) for their life insurance money. A federal loophole is needed to sentence her to forty years in prison without parole. In Sacramento, California, Elisa McNabney and Sarah Dutra murdered McNabney's husband, Larry, on September 10, 2001, with horse tranquilizers. Following their incarceration, Elisa committed suicide in prison, while Sarah was released after serving eight years of an eleven-year sentence. In Melbourne, Australia, Shirley Withers hired two drug addicts -- Stan Collinocos and Sophie Stoupis -- to murder her boyfriend, Peter Shellard, on May 6, 2005, and stage it to look like a sex game gone wrong. Collinocos and Stoupis plead guilty to manslaughter and receive six years in prison. Withers is initially given twenty-six years for murder and two counts of incitement against her coconspirators. On appeal, she is resentenced to nine to thirteen years for manslaughter.
48	9	"Sacrifice Their Blood"	Unknown	Unknown	November 4, 2011
To obtain life insurance, Robin Lee Row set fire to the apartment where her husband and two kids lived in Pocatello, Idaho. She was caught and sentenced to death. Marybeth Tinning of Duanesburg, New York, killed eight of her nine children over a span of multiple years. Tinning was sentenced to 20 years to life; after being denied parole several times, she was released in 2018. During a custody dispute with her husband Xavier over their children, Socorro "Cora" Caro of Northridge, California, fatally shot their three eldest sons and attempted suicide by shooting herself in the mouth. Caro awaits her execution.
49	10	"Deadly Possessions"	Unknown	Unknown	November 11, 2011
Rachel Wade and Sarah Ludemann engaged in an online dispute over a boy, Josh Camacho, in Pinellas Park, Florida. When Sarah confronted Rachel in real life on April 14, 2009, Rachel knifed her to death. Rachel is serving a twenty-seven-year sentence. Heartbroken over losing her grandson, Darrin, to his father, Bruce Barrington, in a custody battle, Caroline Young of Hayward, California, fatally stabbed both Darrin and her granddaughter, Dai-zshia, and attempted to stab herself, all in front of her daughter, the children's mother, Vanessa Torres, on June 19, 1993. She was sentenced to death and died in prison of kidney failure after ten years on death row. Elizabeth "Ma" Duncan of Ojai, California, hired two criminals to kill Olga Kupczyk, the pregnant wife of her son, Frank. On November 17, 1958, the two criminals kidnapped, beat, strangled, and buried Olga alive, killing her and her unborn baby. Duncan and her accomplices were sentenced to death and executed in the gas chamber on August 8, 1962, with Duncan dying alone, as Frank did not attend her execution.
50	11	"An Inconvenient Marriage"	Unknown	Unknown	November 18, 2011
Raynella Dossett Leath received 51 years to life in prison for the 2003 death of her second husband, but was released in 2017 when the case was thrown out. Margaret Rudin of Las Vegas shot and dismembered her husband before going on the run. She was caught and received a life sentence with possibility of parole. After serving 20 years, she was released on January 10, 2020. Linda Lou Charbonneau killed her husband and her nephew in Millsboro, Delaware. Initially sentenced to death, a new trial sentenced her to 20 years in prison. She is eligible for parole in 2017. 5 years later, she's released in 2022.
51	12	"Sins of the Sister"	Unknown	Unknown	November 25, 2011
After being caught stealing money, Sarah Mitchell of Oakland, California, killed and dismembered her sister Stevie. She was sentenced to life in prison without the possibility of parole. Twins Betty Wilson and Peggy Lowe of Huntsville, Alabama, were accused after a man that they knew murdered Wilson's husband Jack and claimed that both women made him do it. Despite Lowe believing that her sister was innocent, Wilson was found guilty and sentenced to life in prison. Kathleen Worrall had a hormonal disease, but the medicine caused weight gain, so she stopped taking it. She became highly irritable and stabbed her younger sister Susan. Worrall died in prison on August 1, 2010.
52	13	"Pleasure from Pain"	Unknown	Unknown	December 2, 2011
In 1760s London, midwife Elizabeth Brownrigg regularly abused, tortured, beat, and starved her servants. It was not until Mary Clifford, one of her servants, died from infected wounds that she was finally exposed. Kerry Lyn Dalton discovered that, while she was in jail, her flatmate, Irene May, had sold some of her belongings to pay for crystal meth. Dalton tortured May to death with the help of her boyfriend, an unknown man and her friend Sheryl Ann Baker in multiple ways, including electrocution, stabbing, and bludgeoning. The body of Irene May was never found afterwards. In Australia, Martha Rendell moved in with her lover, who left his wife but maintained custody of his kids. She swabbed the children's throats with hydrochloric acid to feel sexual pleasure. After killing three of her stepchildren, a fourth escaped and exposed her actions. All three women were sentenced to death. While Dalton still remains on California's death row, Brownrigg was hanged in 1767 with her skeleton being on display as a tourist attraction and Rendell was hanged in 1909, 20 days after her conviction.
53	14	"Lethal Love"	Unknown	Unknown	December 9, 2011
Susan Wright fatally stabbed her husband, Jeff, in 2003. Her sentence was reduced from 25 years to 20 years; she was released from prison on December 30, 2020. Alice Mitchell of Memphis killed her lover Freda Ward after Ward's family forbade her from seeing Mitchell. She was declared insane and was committed to an asylum, where she died. Biochemist Larissa Schuster from Clovis, California, murdered her husband Tim, dissolving his body in a barrel of acid in the garage. Schuster and her accomplice, James Fagone, received life in prison with no parole. The crime earned her the nickname "Acid Lady".
54	15	"Baby-Faced Killers"	Unknown	Unknown	December 16, 2011
In Auburn, California, juvenile offenders Cynthia "Cindy" Collier and Shirley Wolf, desperate to plan a life together on the road, attacked Anna Brackett, an eighty-five-year-old woman, on June 14, 1983, by fatally stabbing her at least twenty-eight times. Both girls were caught very quickly and, because they were minors, sentenced to incarceration until they turned twenty-five. Since their release, Collier has changed her ways and maintained a clean record, while Wolf has remained in trouble with the law. In Suffolk, England, fifteen-year-old Lorraine Thorpe assisted forty-one-year-old Paul Clarke in the murder of Rosalyn Hunt, Clarke's girlfriend, whom he abused, in 2009. When Thorpe's father, Desmond "Des" Thorpe, learned of the murder, he was immediately suspicious of their involvement to the point that they killed him, too. Clarke was sentenced to life with a minimum of twenty-seven years, while Thorpe became England's youngest convicted double murderer and was sentenced to life with a minimum of fourteen years. Thorpe's first bid for parole was denied on October 16, 2023. Courtney Dunkin of Grapevine, Texas, planning to kill her ex-boyfriend and escape to Mexico with her friend, Jamie Hatfield, who wanted to kill her own ex-boyfriend, first drugged and then shot her grandmother, Betty, in 1994. In October 1995, she was found guilty of capital murder and sentenced to forty years to life in prison. She will be eligible for parole in May 2034.
55	16	"Senseless Slayings"	Unknown	Unknown	December 30, 2011
Tina Powell and LaFonda Foster took five friends hostage and killed them all. Foster was sentenced to death and Powell received a life sentence, but in 1991, Foster's death sentence was commuted to life in prison. Melinda Harmon-Raisch was a housewife in Olathe, Kansas, who was having an affair with college student Mark Mangelsdorf. She had Mark murder her husband, then framed two nonexistent black people. The crime went unsolved for two decades until a cold case unit figured out the truth. Melinda and Mark were both convicted of second-degree murder and sentenced to ten to twenty years in prison. Melinda was released in April of 2015 after serving nine years and will be on parole till 2025, while Mark was paroled about a year later. Following the deaths of her husband and two sons in the Melbourne gangland killings, Judy Moran killed her brother-in-law for financial gain. She was sentenced to 26 years in prison.
56	17	"Lover's Revenge"	Unknown	Unknown	January 6, 2012
Jane Andrews, the former wardrobe specialist for Sarah, Duchess of York, murdered her ex-boyfriend in his bed with a baseball bat and a knife. Sentenced to life imprisonment, Jane was paroled in June 2015. Shana Parkinson's volatile temper prompted her husband to leave her for another woman. She stabbed him and his new fiancée to death. When she was caught, she received a sentence of twenty-seven years to life. In Roanoke, Texas, seventeen-year-old Jennifer Bailey dated Paul Henson, who introduced her to Satanism. When Jennifer's mother, Susan, forbade her from seeing Paul, the couple murdered her on September 23, 2008. Jennifer's thirteen-year-old brother, David, and fourteen-year-old friend, Merrilee White, were also involved in the killing. The group, fleeing to Canada, made it as far as Yankton, South Dakota, before being caught. Jennifer and Paul were sentenced to sixty years, with both eligible for parole in 2038, David was sentenced to twenty-six years and is eligible for release in 2034, and Merrilee was sentenced to five years' probation.
57	18	"Deadly Delinquents"	Unknown	Unknown	January 13, 2012
Bernadette Protti, jealous of her classmate, Kirsten Costas, stabbed her to death. Protti served her seven-year sentence in a juvenile facility. On the pretense of reconciling with their old friend, Missy Avila, Karen Severson and Laura Doyle lured Avila into the woods, beat her, cut her hair, and drowned her in a lake. Sentenced to fifteen years to life in prison, both Severson and Doyle were free on parole as of December 2012. Kelly Fuller, at age eighteen, stabbed her ex's new girlfriend, fifteen-year-old Jessica Lang, almost fifty times. Kelly was sentenced to eleven years to life and was released in 2017.
58	19	"Match Made For Murder"	Unknown	Unknown	January 20, 2012
To resolve her financial problems, Patricia Robinson-Olsen had her teenage son Christopher shoot her second husband Neil to death. Patricia got life without parole and Christopher's sentence was 30 years in prison. French immigrant Valerie Pape murdered her abusive husband, Ira Pomerantz, and dismembered his corpse. Pomerantz's torso was found in a dumpster behind a supermarket, but the rest of his remains were never found. Pape was given a sixteen-year sentence and was deported back to France in disgrace following her release in 2016. While attempting to rob an elderly man, Jean Lee and her two accomplices killed him. Lee confessed her involvement hoping for a light prison sentence, but was executed on February 19, 1951. She was the last woman to be hanged in Australia before the death penalty was abolished.
59	20	"Killer Kids"	Unknown	Unknown	January 27, 2012
In 1985, American honor student Elizabeth Haysom convinced her boyfriend Jens Söring to kill her parents. Both Haysom and Söring received life sentences, but were released on parole in November 2019. Fifteen-year-old Heather D'Aoust had depression and bipolar disorder and was briefly institutionalized. After she was caught engaging in sexual activity with a female friend, she killed her mother with a claw hammer. She pled guilty to second-degree murder and got 16 years to life. Nikki Reynolds planned to kill both of her parents after being exposed for lying about a pregnancy to impress a boyfriend. She fatally stabbed her mother, but got too broken up to finish her plan and turned herself in instead of killing her father. Her sentence was thirty-four years, eventually reduced to twenty-one years with good behavior, and she was released from prison in 2019.

=== Season 6 (2012–13) ===
No. overall	No. in season	Title	Directed by	Written by	Original release date
60	1	"Hunting Humans"	Unknown	Unknown	August 17, 2012
Suzan Carson and her husband Michael became involved in illicit drugs and mysticism, believing that God could speak to them. They murdered three people that they believed to be witches. Both are serving 75 years to life, but in a 2015 conviction, they have shown no remorse for the crimes. In London, England, after becoming involved in a gang, 14-year-old Chelsea O'Mahoney and three friends attacked eight people, killing one man, while the group videotaped the assaults. In 2006, O'Mahoney received an eight-year prison sentence, while her accomplices received twelve years. In February 1980, Pamela Lynn Perillo and her friend, James Briddle, rob and strangle Robert Banks and Bob Skeens, two men with whom they were living. Both were sentenced to death; Briddle was executed in 1995. Perillo's sentence was commuted to life plus 30 years in 2000, and she was released from prison in 2019.
61	2	"Parents Peril"	Unknown	Unknown	August 24, 2012
High school student Dorothy "Marie" Robards fatally poisoned her father, Steven. She kept the murder a secret for a year until her college roommate recited Claudius's guilt monologue from Hamlet, causing her to break down and confess. After shooting her mother in the head, Dorothy Ellingson went to a party. In prison, she gave lectures to teenagers on the dangers of delinquency. In Queens, New York City, Brigitte Harris, visiting her sister, Carleen Goodridge, encountered their father, Eric Goodridge, who had molested her as a child. After he announced his plans to return to Africa with his granddaughter, Carleen's daughter, Harris handcuffed, suffocated, and stabbed him to save her niece from the same fate that she had suffered. Inspired by Lorena Bobbitt, she then removed his penis with a knife and threw it into the Atlantic Ocean. All three women were released from prison. Robards and Harris still live today, while Ellingson died on September 16, 1967.
62	3	"Insatiable Greed"	Unknown	Unknown	August 31, 2012
Dena Thompson attempted to murder her third husband and was sentenced to three years in jail. When police discovered large amounts of poison in the exhumed body of her second husband, she was sentenced to a minimum of 16 years. She was released on parole in June 2022. Louise Vermilya used arsenic to murder two of her husbands, five stepchildren, and two other men. She did not face prison time after she poisoned herself, which paralyzed her. Brookey Lee West gagged her elderly mother with a grocery bag, stuffed her into a trash can, and put it into storage, where it remained undisturbed for three years. She is serving life without parole.
63	4	"Matriarchs of Murder"	Unknown	Unknown	September 7, 2012
Frances Creighton poisoned her relatives with arsenic when they were no longer useful to her. After being acquitted of murdering her brother, Frances moved to New York and two neighbors began living with them. When she wanted her 15 year old daughter to marry a boarder, Creighton killed his wife. She and the boarder were convicted and executed by electric chair. Betty Neumar had five husbands, four of whom died while married to her. For decades, no one connected any of the deaths until a cold case investigation. She died in 2011 before facing trial. Seventy-two-year-old Millicent Cumberbatch killed her husband, Stanley, after they formally separated. Her sentence was eleven-and-a-half to fifteen years.
64	5	"Web of Death"	Unknown	Unknown	September 14, 2012
In Hickory, North Carolina, Elisa Baker convinced her online lover and husband, Adam Baker, and his young daughter, Zahra, to move from Australia to North Carolina to be with her. Elisa tortured Zahra, who eventually died on September 24, 2010, after which Elisa dismembered her body. She was sentenced to only eighteen years in prison. Della Sutorius was sentenced to 23 years to life for murdering her fifth husband. She died in prison on November 20, 2010. Sandy Cain moved to New York to be with her husband Frank, whom she had met over the Internet. She shot him and tried to make the crime look like a self-defense attempt. Sandy pleaded guilty to second-degree murder and received 10 to 25 years. She was paroled in 2011.
65	6	"Murder of Innocence"	Unknown	Unknown	September 21, 2012
When Theresa Riggi's husband Pasquale divorced her and tried to apply for full custody of their children, she stabbed all three children and unsuccessfully attempted suicide on August 4, 2010. Sentenced to 16 years, Theresa died in custody in March 2014 after being attacked with a razor blade. Elise Ledvina, convinced that she was a bad mother due to her schizophrenia, bludgeoned her two sons with a baseball bat; her elder son was saved by his father's intervention, but the younger son died. She was acquitted by reason of insanity. Philadelphia housewife Marie Noe she smothered eight of her ten children; the remaining two were stillborn. She was not caught until 50 years after the first murder. Noe was given five years' house arrest and 20 years' probation. She died in 2016.
66	7	"Love You to Pieces"	Unknown	Unknown	September 28, 2012
In 1991, 23-year-old Omaima Aree murdered her 56-year-old husband Bill Nelson, then dismembered and consumed his corpse. She was found guilty of second-degree murder and was sentenced to 26 years to life. She was denied parole twice, in 2006 and 2011. She will not be eligible for parole again until 2026. Lyda Trueblood used arsenic to kill several relatives, including her husbands and her own daughter. After getting caught, Lyda escaped from prison, almost committing another murder before being apprehended again. Lyda was paroled in 1941 and died of a heart attack in 1958 at the age of 65. When businesswoman Amy DeChant's lover Bruce Weinstein threatened to end their relationship, Amy killed him and robbed him of over $100,000. Her sentence was 25 years with possibility of parole after 10 years.
67	8	"No Good Reason"	Unknown	Unknown	October 5, 2012
In 1983, Andrea Hicks Jackson of Jacksonville, Florida, called the police to file a report about a vandalized car. When Officer Gary Bevel arrived on the scene, Andrea shot him five times. She was sentenced to death, but her sentence was later commuted to life in prison without parole, much to the chagrin of Bevel's fellow officers. On October 21, 2009, 15-year-old Alyssa Bustamante lured nine-year-old Elizabeth Olten into the woods, where she slashed Olten's throat and strangled her to death. Afterwards, Alyssa disposed of Elizabeth's body in a pre-dug grave. Bustamante announced what she had done on social media. She received a life sentence with possibility of parole after thirty years. In October 1991, Felicia Morgan, a 17-year-old from inner-city Milwaukee, Wisconsin, shot Brenda Evans for her leather coat. Morgan was sentenced to 13 years to life. She applied for parole five times since 2005, but was denied each time, despite support from Brenda's family.
68	9	"Teen Terror"	Unknown	Unknown	October 12, 2012
Natasha Cornett and a group of friends killed 34-year-old Vidar Lillelid, six-year-old Tabitha, and 28-year-old Delfina. Each member of the group was sentenced to life with no possibility of parole. Tiana Browne, after being raped, was taken in by her aunt, becoming roommates with her cousin Shannon. Tiana, jealous of Shannon's success in school, stabbed her to death, then stole her sneakers and cell phone. Tiana was found guilty of second-degree murder and was sentenced to fifteen years to life. She was granted parole in 2023. Between 1979 and 1980, while working as a babysitter, Helen Moore suffocated her half-brother, her cousin, two infants, and another child in her care. Only one child survived. She then strangled and suffocated her seven-year-old brother Peter to death, and was turned in by her mother, Jessie. She received a life sentence, but was paroled after thirteen years.
69	10	"Too Close for Comfort"	James Knox	Unknown	October 19, 2012
Following an argument with her neighbor Jason Horsley and his girlfriend over the loud barking of their dogs, Malaika Griffin shot Horsley in the back, killing him, then evaded capture for six years. She is serving life without parole. Ellen Etheridge poisoned eight of her stepchildren with lye, killing four. Also suspected of killing her husband's first wife, she was given a life sentence without parole. In the incredibly Victorian and busy city of Aberdeen, Scotland, Scottish chef Pamela Gourlay stabbed her neighbor, Melanie Sturton, to death, stealing money and a gift card. Sentenced to fourteen years to life, she was paroled in October 2013.
70	11	"Ruthless Revenge"	James Knox	Unknown	October 26, 2012
In York, England, after breaking up with her lover, Adrian Sinclair, Heather Stevenson-Snell posed as a trick-or-treater on October 31, 2003, and attempted to kill Sinclair's wife, Diane Lomax, with a shotgun. However, in a twist, she instead killed Diane's innocent neighbor, Robert "Bob" Wilkie, when he saw her face. She was sentenced to twenty-two years to life. Her first bid for parole was denied on February 18, 2022. Feminist mother and housewife Anne Bradley of Salt Lake City, Utah, was a prominent, respected worker in women's rights until she had an affair with U.S. Senator Arthur Brown that lasted for eight years and produced two illegitimate sons. When the two finally broke up for good, Bradley shot him to death on December 13, 1906, while he was on business in Washington, D.C. Anne was tried for first-degree murder, but surprisingly, she was acquitted. Brittany Norwood, a worker at a Lululemon store in Bethesda, Maryland, murdered her manager and coworker, Jayna Murray, after being caught shoplifting. Norwood received life without parole, with her appeal in 2015 being denied.
71	12	"Bury their Babies"	Unknown	Unknown	November 2, 2012
Stacey Barker suffocated her 18-month-old daughter, Emma, after her boyfriend told her that he did not want to be a father to Emma. Barker was sentenced to 25 years to life. Suffering from postpartum depression, Kelly Silk killed her husband, two of her children, and herself. In August 2003, Nicole Diar murdered her son and set their Ohio home on fire to cover the evidence. She is serving life without parole after being initially sentenced to death.
72	13	"Kinky Killers"	Unknown	Unknown	November 9, 2012
Debra Denise Brown and her boyfriend, Alton Coleman, embarked on a 1984 killing spree through several Midwestern states. Both were sentenced to death in Ohio. Coleman was executed in 2002, and Brown's sentence was commuted to life without parole. However, Brown was also given a death sentence in Indiana, though in 2019, it was commuted to an additional life sentence without parole. Janice Buttrum and her husband Danny befriended Demetra Faye Parker. In September 1980, they decided to use Parker in their sex game, where they beat and raped her, and Janice stabbed her 97 times. Both were sentenced to death, but Danny died by suicide and Janice's sentence was commuted to life in prison in 1989. Michelle Michaud and her boyfriend James Daveggio abducted and raped several young women, including her own daughter. In December 1997, they kidnapped, raped, tortured, and strangled 22-year-old Vanessa Lei Samson. Both were sentenced to death.
73	14	"Death Benefits"	Unknown	Unknown	November 16, 2012
Manling Tsang Williams (曾玫琳 Zēng Méilín) smothered her two sons, Devon and Ian, with a pillow and slashed her husband, Neal, 97 times with a samurai sword to be with another man. In mid-20th-century Alabama, Rhonda Belle Martin used arenic to poison and kill two husbands, three children, and her mother, and left a surviving husband paralyzed. Marilyn Kay Plantz convinced her boyfriend and his friend to murder her husband by beating him to death and burning his body, so that Plantz can collect the life insurance. All three women were sentenced to death. While Williams remains on death row, Martin was executed by Alabama's Yellow Mama in 1957 (before she was sentenced, she left her brain to science), and Plantz was executed in 2001 by lethal injection.
74	15	"Mommy's Little Helpers"	James Knox	Unknown	November 23, 2012
Hilma Marie Witte talked her sons, Eric and John, into committing murder. Eric shot his father, Paul, and John murdered his grandmother, Elaine, with a crossbow so that his mother could continue to steal Elaine's money. Both sons served 11 years in prison before being released on good behavior in 1996. Meanwhile, Hilma was sentenced to 90 years, but may be released as early as 2027. Lois "Mean Nadean" Smith tortured and killed Cindy Bailee, the ex-girlfriend of her son Greg, then made Greg and his new girlfriend, Teresa Baker, clean up the crime scene. Baker confessed in exchange for immunity, and Lois Smith was sentenced to death. She was executed in 2001 after spending 19 years in prison. Greg Smith was given a life sentence in 1983, but was paroled in 2009 after spending 26 years in prison. In the Victorian port city of Glasgow, Scotland, Edith McAlinden fatally stabbed her boyfriend, 42-year-old David Gillespie during a vicious argument, and then enlisted her 16-year-old son, John, and his friend, Jamie Gray, to murder the two surviving witnesses, 67-year-old Ian Mitchell, and 71-year-old Irishman Tony Coyle. Both boys received 12-year sentences, and Edith was sentenced to 13 years to life.
75	16	"Eternal Revenge"	Unknown	Unknown	November 30, 2012
In 1880s Los Angeles, Lastania Abarta shot her ex-fiancé Chico Forster, who lied to her and then raped her, to death, but was found not guilty by reason of insanity. She then married another man. Diane Borchardt manipulated three students, Michael Maldonado, Douglas Vest, and Joshua Yanke, into murdering her ex-husband, Ruben. Borchardt was sentenced to 40 years to life. Marcela Whaley hired two people to rape and murder her ex-girlfriend Tzatzi Sanchez, who left Whaley for Whaley's ex-girlfriend. She was prosecuted under Mexican law for the murder, as she and Tzatzi were both Mexican nationals. She is serving a thirty-seven-year sentence in a Mexican prison, doing incredibly hard time.
76	17	"Without Conscience"	James Knox	Unknown	January 4, 2013
Gunn-Britt Ashfield falsely accused her six-year-old son John of molesting his younger sister Melissa and beat him to death. Ashfield was sentenced to 19 years in prison, with a minimum of 14 years. She was released from prison in August 2011, then changed her name to "Angelic". In 1950s Cincinnati, Edythe Klumpp fatally shot Louise, the wife of her lover, then attempted to burn the body out of jealousy. Initially sentenced to death, Klumpp was paroled in 1971. Kelly O'Donnell bludgeoned Terry Eleftheriou in her apartment, enlisting her lover, Bill Gribble, into dismembering the body while Eleftheriou was still alive. O'Donnell and Gribble were sentenced to death, and later, their death sentences were commuted to life in prison.
77	18	"Bury the Boyfriend"	James Knox	Unknown	January 11, 2013
Regina and Margaret DeFrancisco shot Regina's boyfriend, Oscar Velazquez, in the head for profit. The sisters remained fugitives for two years before they were caught. Regina and Margaret were sentenced to 35 and 46 years in prison respectively. In Las Vegas in 1863, Laura Fair shot lawyer Alexander P. Crittenden in front of his wife after seven years of broken promises. Fair was acquitted by reason of insanity. Vicky Efandis poisoned and burned painter George Marcetta alive in his house to gain his assets. She was sentenced to 20 to 24 years in prison.
78	19	"Death Knock"	James Knox	Unknown	January 18, 2013
In Tucson, Arizona, Shawna Forde and her group of "minutemen" vigilantes murdered Raul Flores and his daughter, Brisenia, wounded his wife, Gina, and robbed their house. Forde was sentenced to death. In Springfield, Missouri, Shirley Jo Phillips shot and dismembered her friend Wilma Plaster to cover up the theft of a check for $4000. She was later suspected of killing her own mother in the same way. Phillips was initially sentenced to death, but her sentence was commuted to life without parole. In late 1980s Chicago, Dorothy Williams shot and strangled three elderly people for their money. She was initially sentenced to death, but it was commuted to three life sentences without parole. She died in an Illinois prison on December 19, 2020, one week after her 66th birthday.
79	20	"Brides of Blood"	James Knox	Unknown	January 25, 2013
In 1981, Andrea Claire killed her fifth husband, Robert Sand, by stabbing him 27 times after being treated as a sex slave, then attempted to kill her sixth husband the following year. She was sentenced to 26 years to life in prison. In 1831 in North Carolina, Frankie Stewart Silver murdered her husband Charles Silver with a hatchet, then she dismembered his corpse and burned his remains. Silver was sentenced to death and hanged on July 12, 1833. To this day, her father's role in the crime is still debated. Danielle Stewart, who suffered from untreated BPD and multiple tragedies in her life, stabbed her husband Chaim Kimel to death in a drunken rage in 2006. She pleaded guilty to manslaughter and was sentenced to six years in prison. She was released after serving four.

=== Season 7 (2013) ===
No. overall	No. in season	Title	Directed by	Written by	Original release date
80	1	"Malicious Hearts"	Unknown	Unknown	July 19, 2013
Angela McAnulty tortured, starved, and beat her eldest daughter, 15-year-old Jeanette Maples, to death. She and her husband Richard, who failed to report the abuse, were prosecuted. Richard was sentenced to 25 years to life, and Angela was sentenced to death row, but her sentence was commuted to life without parole in August 2020. Nurse Bertha Gifford murdered 17 of her patients with arsenic, including several members of her husband's family. Acquitted of murder by reason of insanity, she was institutionalized for 23 years until her death in 1951. Nicole Hollinshead convinced her boyfriend, Steven Wood, and two of her friends, Kerry Bauer and Emma Last, to beat Debra Carne, douse her with gasoline, and burn her alive. Steven was given an eight-year sentence, Kerry and Emma were both sentenced to 17 years to life, and Nicole was released after serving a five-year sentence for conspiracy.
81	2	"Money Hungry"	Unknown	Unknown	July 26, 2013
Scam artist Dorice "Dee Dee" Moore befriended, then fatally shot, lottery winner Abraham Shakespeare in order to steal his money. She inadvertently confessed to an undercover cop and was imprisoned for life without parole. Anne Gates married and killed two husbands for their money, shooting the first execution-style and beating the second with a fireplace poker. Gates served four years in prison for her second husband's murder. Her first husband's murder remained an open case. Gates died from kidney failure in 2016. Australian Patricia Byers is sent to jail for the attempted murder of her boyfriend, and police investigated the disappearance of her de facto husband, Carl Gottgens, whom she claimed left her for another woman. Patricia received a life sentence without parole for Carl's murder, although his body was never found.
82	3	"Without Pity"	Unknown	Unknown	August 2, 2013
On June 5, 2009, in Beaverton, Oregon, Korena Elaine Roberts beat pregnant Heather Snively to death with a collapsible police baton and cut the stillborn baby boy, John Stephen, out of her womb. She was sentenced to life in prison without parole. In Toronto, Ontario, Elva Bottineau and her common-law husband Norman Kidman abused their five-year-old grandson, Jeffrey Baldwin, and his older sister. On November 30, 2002, Jeffrey died of sepsis. The case caused the Ontario law regarding background checks of caregivers to be revised. Bottineau and Kidman were given a life sentence without the possibility of parole for 22 and 23 years, respectively. After Rekha Kumari-Baker's divorce in Stretham, she fatally stabbed both of her teenage daughters to punish her ex-husband. She was sentenced to 33 years in prison.
83	4	"Mean Teens"	Unknown	Unknown	August 9, 2013
In Saugerties, New York, Gweneviere "Wendy" Gardner made her boyfriend, James Evans, strangle her maternal grandmother on December 28, 1994. The couple then held Wendy's sister, Kathy, hostage for three days until she was able to escape and get help from a neighbor. James was sentenced to sixteen years to life in prison, and Wendy was sentenced to seven years and ten months. Wendy was paroled in 2004, and James in 2014, but they broke up during their incarceration. Nakisha Waddell of Troy, Virginia, stabbed her mother, Vaughne, 43 times after she was forbidden from seeing her boyfriend. She and her friend Annie Belcher hid the body in a tool shed. Waddell and Belcher were sentenced to 70 years and 26 years in prison, respectively. Waddell is eligible for parole in 2038. While Belcher was released from prison in 2018, she died six years later in April 2024 at age 35. Cheerleader Gina Grant beat her mother to death in 1990, serving less than a year in prison. Grant was denied acceptance to Harvard University due to lying on her application, which was exposed by the anonymous writer of a letter sent to the university.
84	5	"Vicious Vixens"	Unknown	Unknown	August 16, 2013
Tracy Lee Poirier and her lover, Tamara Marie Upton, robbed and beat a photographer, then disposed of his unconscious body in a nearby river. Both were sentenced to life without parole. Poirier attempted to escape prison in 1998, but was later recaptured, while Upton died in prison in 2019. In San Diego in 1987, Deana Wild died in a fall at Big Sur. The authorities discovered that Virginia Rearden McGinnis and her husband, Billy Joe "B.J." McGinnis, took out a life insurance policy on her, as they were serial insurance claimants; Virginia was suspected to have killed her daughter for insurance money fifteen years earlier. Billy Joe died before trial and Virginia received a life sentence, dying in prison in June 2011. Tracie Andrews stabbed her boyfriend, Lee Harvey, forty-two times, attempting to disguise the murder as an incident of road rage. She was sentenced to life imprisonment, but was freed after serving fourteen years.
85	6	"Evil Guardians"	Unknown	Unknown	August 23, 2013
Ellen Boehm smothered her two sons to death and attempted to electrocute her daughter. She was given two life sentences with no chance of parole. After joining a cultish church, Dena Schlosser killed her ten-month-old daughter, Margaret, to "send her to heaven", but was acquitted of murder by reason of insanity and was institutionalized for six years. Gemma Killeen left her son to drown at the beach and told investigators that the child was abducted. She was sentenced to life with 13 years minimum.
86	7	"Wed to Murder"	Unknown	Unknown	August 30, 2013
In 1982, Shirley Allen poisoned her husband, Lloyd, with antifreeze for his life insurance money. She was also suspected of murdering her previous husband in 1978 under similar circumstances. Allen served a life sentence with possibility of parole after serving 50 years, but died in prison in July 2000. In 20th century Memphis, Tennessee, sex worker Alma Theede killed three of her husbands. She died on October 15, 1970, at the age of 74. In Jupiter, Florida, Donna Horwitz shot her ex-husband, Lanny, ten times on September 30, 2011, and attempted to disguise the murder as a suicide. She was sentenced to life without parole, but after a retrial, her sentence was commuted to thirty-two years.
87	8	"Lethal Teens"	Unknown	Unknown	September 6, 2013
Fourteen-year-old Cinnamon Brown was convicted of the February 1985 murder of her stepmother, Linda. In prison, she confessed that her father, David, manipulated Cinnamon into committing the murder. David was sent to prison for life without parole and Cinnamon was paroled in 1992. Danielle Black convinced her friend Alec Eger to stab Black's father, Billy, to death on October 31, 2008. Both received life sentences, though Black was paroled in 2019. During a house party, Jennifer Tombs shot babysitter Latanya Lavallais five times in the head and tried to disguise the murder as a home invasion. She was tried as an adult and sentenced to life without parole.
88	9	"Above The Law"	Unknown	Unknown	September 13, 2013
Stephanie Ilene Lazarus, a police detective, stalked, harassed, and murdered Sherri Rasmussen. The killing remained a cold case for over 20 years until evidence surfaced, incriminating her. She was sentenced to 27 years to life. Her first bid for parole was denied on October 2, 2024. In 1940s Memphis, Tennessee, 49-year-old Georgia Tann, hailed as "the mother of modern adoption", adopted babies out to Hollywood actors and childless couples, but neglected the ones she believed unworthy of adoption. Her actions may have resulted in the deaths of as many as 500 babies. She died of cancer in 1950. Scientist Ann Brier Miller had her extramarital boyfriend, Derril Willard, poison her husband, Eric, with arsenic. Willard died by suicide after confessing the murder, and Miller received a minimum of 25 years in prison.
89	10	"Sadistic Souls"	Unknown	Unknown	September 20, 2013
In January 1996, Vickie Frost fatally stabbed her visually impaired boyfriend, 21-year-old Rick Whitcomb. Pleading guilty to voluntary manslaughter, Vickie was given a nine-year sentence and was released in 2005. In 2009, in Chilton, County Durham, England Clare Nicholls, along with her brother Simon and her ex-partner Steve, frequently abused the father of her youngest child, 35-year-old Andrew Gardner. She then stomped on his chest, killing him, claiming that he was attacked by a mugger. Clare was sentenced to 32 years to life, while Simon received a sentence of 25 years and Steve received a sentence of 20 years. Christene Kemmerlin, under the pretense that she was a victim of domestic violence, convinced a neighbor, Anton Johnson, to murder her third husband, Wayne. She was initially sentenced to death, but her sentence was commuted to life without parole, a sentence that Anton is also serving. At the end of the episode, announcer Lynnanne Zager erroneously says, "They were 'Sadistic Killers'" instead of 'Sadistic Souls'.
90	11	"Heartless Souls"	Unknown	Unknown	September 27, 2013
In September 2009, Ruby Thomas, age 15, and her friends Joel Alexander and Rachael Burke, kicked 62-year-old LGBT rights advocate Ian Baynham to death. She was given a seven-year prison sentence, the murder officially labeled a hate crime, but served two and a half. In Santa Barbara, California, in 1978, 22-year-old Julia Diaz exorted a family out of $1,000 after attacking their young daughter with a hammer. She then went after seven-year-old Javier Angel bludgeoning, strangling, and suffocating him in a garbage bag. Diaz was sentenced to life in prison with the possibility of parole after 25 years. Her first parole hearing was denied in 2011, with the next one to take place in 2026. Babysitter Caroline Reed Robertson strangled 15-year-old Rachel Barber with a phone cord, planning to assume her identity. Robertson was given a 20-year sentence and released on parole in January 2015.
91	12	"Vengeance"	Unknown	Unknown	October 4, 2013
After sending her six-year-old son to a summer camp, where he was molested by 31-year-old convicted pedophile Daniel Driver, Ellie Starr Nesler shot Driver to death on April 2, 1993. She served three years for manslaughter, but later returned to jail for selling drugs. She died of breast cancer in 2008. In March 1980, Jean Harris fatally shot Scarsdale Diet creator Herman Tarnower in his house. She was released from prison to undergo triple bypass surgery and died in 2012 at the age of 89. Amina Chaudary murdered Rajesh, the eight-year-old nephew of her former lover, Vijay Gupta, in February 1982. She served 28 years in prison and was paroled in 2019.
92	13	"Dark Hearts"	Unknown	Unknown	October 11, 2013
In 2008, after being suspected of forging checks, Miriam Francis Helmick shot her husband Alan in the head. She received a life sentence for the murder, with an additional 108 years for fraud and conspiracy to commit murder. She was also suspected of murdering her first husband five years earlier. Clara Green Carl poisoned two of her husbands and her father-in-law with arsenic for their inheritance money. Sentenced to life, she was paroled after serving 15 years. Carol Kemp stabbed her crush Martin Rusling once in the heart due to untreated BPD. Despite being remorseful for her crime, she was sentenced to life with a minimum of 13 years.
93	14	"Innocent Blood"	Unknown	Unknown	October 18, 2013
In March 2011 in Greenville, Mississippi, Terrie Robinson placed her three-year-old son, Tristan, in an oven due to untreated schizophrenic delusions. Despite showing sincere remorse, she was given a life sentence without parole. Fiona Donnison smothered her two children to get back at her ex-husband out of jealousy. She pleaded not guilty by reason of insanity, but was sentenced to 32 years in prison. Jewell Hendricks smothered and crushed her son Robert to death in January 2010. She was sentenced to 15 years to life.
94	15	"Double Trouble"	Unknown	Unknown	October 25, 2013
In Tucson, Arizona, Clarissa Sanchez convinced her boyfriend Larry "Ray" Coronado to beat her father to death with a baseball bat. Coronado and Sanchez were sentenced to life and 21 years, respectively. In 1930s France, Christine and Lea Papin stabbed and beat their employer and her daughter to death and gouged out their eyes. Both were sentenced to hard labor, Christine for 10 years and Lea for 5. With the intention of eloping, Connie Leung and her boyfriend Eric Louissant strangled Leung's parents to death and dumped their bodies in the East River. Both were sentenced to 30 years to life for second-degree murder.
95	16	"Killer Kin"	Unknown	Unknown	November 1, 2013
In Marengo, Iowa, café owner Denise Leone Frei enlisted her son, Jacob Hilgendorf, and his girlfriend, Jessica Dayton, to beat her live-in boyfriend, Curtis Bailey, to death. All three were given life sentences without parole. At Stephanie Hudnall's urging, her nineteen-year-old daughter, Guenevere "Gwen" Hudnall, killed her father with a pickaxe. Both mother and daughter were sentenced to forty years for second-degree murder, each in separate prisons. Gwen has since ended all contact with her mother, blaming her for their current incarceration. Helen Ryan hired a hitman, Kenneth Brooks, to kill her husband Jeffrey, and informed her mother and sister, Coralie and Ganene Coulter, of the plot. Ganene, Coralie, Brooks, and Ryan were sentenced to seven years and four months, twenty years, thirty-eight years, and thirty-six years, respectively.
96	17	"No Mercy"	Unknown	Unknown	November 8, 2013
In Russellville, Alabama, in August 2008, Christie Michelle Scott gave her autistic son Mason an overdose of cough syrup, set her house on fire, and allowed her son to die of smoke inhalation. She received a death sentence. Sneza Suteski embezzled $180,000 from Richard Piech's car dealership over a period of six months and hired a hit man to beat and kill him. She was sentenced to 24 years in prison. The money was not recovered. Katrina Sarkissian fatally stabbed Deanna Maran in the chest, then died by suicide with an overdose of antidepressants.
97	18	"Souls of Stone"	Unknown	Unknown	November 15, 2013
In 1999, home nurse Donna Kay Trapani killed 48-year-old Martha "Gail" Fulton, the wife of George Fulton, whom Trapani had an affair with. She was given a life sentence without parole. Clara Jane Schwartz manipulated her friends, Michael Pfohl, Katherine "Katie" Inglis, and Kyle Hulbert, into killing her father, Robert. Inglis served a one-year sentence for conspiracy to commit murder, Pfohl was given an 18-year sentence, Hulbert was sentenced to life without parole, and Schwartz was given 48 years in prison, with an approximate release date of November 2, 2043. In the early 1960s, 30-year-old Iva Kroeger strangled her friend Mildred Arneson, as well as Arneson's ex-husband Jay. Kroeger and her husband, Ralph, were both convicted of first-degree murder. Ralph died in prison, while Iva was released after serving 13 years. She died of cervical cancer in 2000.
98	19	"Brutal Brides"	Unknown	Unknown	November 22, 2013
In 1899, Katie Cook shot her husband Tom in the head. She was acquitted of the murder. In 1982, Pauline Rogers attempted to kill her husband Luther with arsenic, but he survives. Police discovered that Pauline also used arsenic to murder her previous husband, and she received two 22-year sentences. In 1930s Philadelphia, Rose Carina and business partner Paul Petrillo supplied women with arsenic to kill their relatives. One client, Maria Favato, killed three men. Petrillo was sentenced to death and executed in the spring of 1941. Favato was given life without parole, while Carina was acquitted.
99	20	"Untamed Evil"	Unknown	Unknown	November 29, 2013
Linda Carty murdered her neighbor Joana Rodriguez to steal her newborn child. Despite claiming and maintaining her innocence, she was sentenced to death. Margie "Maggie" Hamilton was arrested for the murders of two of her husbands. She served six months in jail for her second husband's death and was not incarcerated again. Hamilton attempted another murder after her release. In October 2007, Rachel Pfitzer shook her two-year-old Dean Shillingsworth, stuffed him into a suitcase, and dumped his body in a duck pond. She was sentenced to 25 and a half years in prison.

=== Season 8 (2014) ===
No. overall	No. in season	Title	Directed by	Written by	Original release date
100	1	"Lady of Blood"	Unknown	Unknown	August 1, 2014
Lizzie Borden was a Massachusetts woman suspected of the double axe murder of her father and stepmother. She was found not guilty due to a lack of evidence definitively pointing to her guilt, but remained guilty under public opinion.
101	2	"Mom's Money"	Unknown	Unknown	August 1, 2014
Doris Ann Carlson of Peoria, Arizona, and her husband, David, hired twenty-year-old Dan McReaken and seventeen-year-old Scott Smith to fatally stab her mother-in-law, Lynne, on October 25, 1996. Lynne survived her injuries for six months. McReaken received life without parole for first-degree murder, Scott received ten years for second-degree murder and was released in 2006, David received life without parole for conspiracy to commit murder, and Doris was sentenced to death for conspiracy to commit first-degree murder and first-degree burglary. Her sentence was later commuted to life in prison without parole. In Burbank, California, high school student Amber Merrie Bray persuaded her love interest, Jeff Ayers, to stab her mother, Dixie, to death, on January 16, 1996. The pair also attempted to kill Bray's sister, Amy. Convicted of first-degree murder and conspiracy to commit murder, Amber and Jeff were given life in prison without parole. On March 3, 2011, Tashia Stuart shot her mother, Judy Hebert, to death in Pasco, Washington, claiming self-defense. She was convicted of both attempted murder and first-degree murder and sentenced to forty-five years in prison.
102	3	"Never Too Young"	Unknown	Unknown	August 8, 2014
In West Wendover, Nevada, Toni Fratto and her boyfriend, Kody Patten, kidnapped and murdered Patten's friend, Micaela "Mickey" Costanzo. Fratto pled guilty to second-degree murder and conspiracy to commit murder and received life in prison with the possibility of parole after 18 years, while Patten went to trial, was convicted of first-degree murder and conspiracy to commit murder, and was given life in prison without parole. Fratto's first bid for parole was denied on March 29, 2021. When she was twelve, Sharon Carr stabbed eighteen-year-old hairdresser Katie Rackliff to death. When she was imprisoned for stabbing another girl two years later, she confessed to Rackliff's murder. Carr was sentenced to life with a minimum of 14 years, becoming the youngest female murderer given that sentence in the United Kingdom. In 2002, Katherine "Katie" Belflower, alongside her lover Michael "Mike" Simmons and friend Jeffrey Hamilton, fatally shot her classmate Jenna Nannetti. Bellflower and Hamilton also attempted to kill another girl, Aspen Lum. Bellflower was sentenced to 25 years to life in prison, Simmons received life without parole, and Hamilton was given 20 years to life.
103	4	"Three's a Crowd"	Unknown	Unknown	August 15, 2014
On October 12, 2011, Michelle Gable of Helena, Montana, shot and killed her husband, Joe, and his mistress, Sunday Bennett, whom he met during a two-year separation. She was convicted of both murders and sentenced to 200 years in prison. She will be eligible for parole when she is ninety-nine years old. On March 20, 1927, nineteen-year-old Ruth Brown Snyder of Queens, New York, killed her husband, Albert, for his life insurance money, accompanied by her lover, Judd Gray. The two planned to run away together. They were apprehended, and both were sentenced to death. In 1928, both were executed in the electric chair. In Brentwood, Tennessee, Martha Ann Freeman and her lover, illegal immigrant Rafael Rocha-Perez, beat and strangled her husband, Jeffrey, to death on April 10, 2005. They were both found guilty of murder and conspiracy and sentenced to fifty-one years to life in prison.
104	5	"Catch Me If You Can"	Unknown	Unknown	August 22, 2014
In Vancouver, British Columbia, in 1992, Jean Ann James stabbed and slashed the throat of her friend Gladys Wakabayashi. She remained free for sixteen years until inadvertently confessing to undercover cops, and was sentenced to 25 years to life for first-degree murder. Annie Monahan of New Haven, Connecticut, poisoned three of her husbands and her niece with arsenic. She was sentenced to life for her third husband's murder and died in prison. In Hammond, Indiana, Linda Darby poisoned her husband Charles, shot him, and burned his body. She was sentenced to life, but two years later, she escaped of prison and lived under the pseudonym Linda McElroy in Pulaski, Tennessee, for 35 years before being caught and sent back to prison in 2007.
105	6	"Hunger for Cash"	Unknown	Unknown	August 22, 2014
In Van Nuys, California, on April 25, 1985, nurse Maureen "Miki" McDermott hired her coworker, Jimmy Luna, and two brothers, Marvin and Dondell Lee, to stab her friend, Stephen Eldridge, to death and cut off his penis to disguise the killing as a hate crime, all to collect on his life insurance money. McDermott was sentenced to death, and Luna pled guilty and received life in prison without parole. The Lee brothers received immunity for giving evidence against McDermott and Luna. During the Great Depression, widow Marie Kappen Porter of St. Louis, Illinois, enlisted employee Ralph Giancola and his younger brother, John, to help kill her brother, William "Willie" Kappen, for his life insurance money on July 3, 1937. Both Maria and Ralph were sentenced to death and executed in the electric chair on January 28, 1938, ten minutes apart from one another. John received ninety-nine years in prison. In Dean, Texas, Texan billionaire Jerry Sternadel accused his accountant, Debra Lynn Baker, and his wife, Lou Ann, of stealing $35,000. Baker poisoned him to death with arsenic on June 12, 1990, and was convicted of first-degree murder, receiving an astonishing ten years' probation. Nine years later, she receives ten years in prison for writing a forged check in another county. Lou Ann was neither investigated nor charged in Jerry's murder.
106	7	"Self-Made Widows"	Unknown	Unknown	August 29, 2014
Linda Calvey paid a hit man, Daniel Reece, £10,000 to kill her husband Ronnie Cook, but chose to shoot Cook herself. She served 18-and-a-half years in prison. Reece is serving life without parole. Angelina Rodriguez poisoned her husband, Frank Rodriguez in 2000. She is also a suspect in the death of her baby daughter, Alicia Fuller. She was sentenced to death; following a retrial in 2010, she was re-sentenced to death by the California Supreme Court. In 1930, Anna Antonio hired two friends to murder her abusive husband, Salvatore Antonio. The two men stabbed and shot Salvatore and the three were sentenced to death. Anna Antonio was executed in the electric chair in 1934.
107	8	"Lover's Revenge (2nd)"	Unknown	Unknown	September 5, 2014
In Raleigh, North Carolina, Camellia Brown, believing out of delusion that her ex-husband, Thierry, was sexually abusing their children, shot him to death on March 24, 2006. She pled guilty to second-degree murder and was sentenced to a minimum of seventeen years in prison. In Chicago, Illinois, Geraldine Smith hired her friends, Marva Golden and Eddie Williams, to shoot and kill Valerie, the wife of her lover, Louia McDonald, on June 23, 1987. Golden was sentenced to twenty years and is currently free, Williams to life without parole, and Smith to death, though her sentence was commuted to life in prison. Smith was later released on parole in 2008. In Adelaide, Australia, Michelle Burgess and her boyfriend, David Key, stabbed Carolyn Matthews forty-one times on July 12, 2001, and also intended to kill Burgess's estranged husband, Darren. Matthews's husband, Kevin, was also involved in the plot. He and Burgess were sentenced to life in prison with a non-parole period of thirty years, while Key was sentenced to twenty years.
108	9	"Heartless"	Unknown	Unknown	September 12, 2014
In 2009, Angela Simpson tortured and killed a paralyzed man who claimed to be a police informant. She was sentenced to life without parole. Kemi Adeyoola wrote a manual on how to rob and kill elderly people, then killed 84-four-year-old Anne Mendel in 2005. She was apprehended and sentenced to 20 years to life. In Jersey City, New Jersey, Latonia Bellamy and her cousin, Shiquan, robbed and killed an engaged couple, Nia Haqq and Michael Muchioski. Latonia was convicted of felony murder, robbery, and carjacking. She and Shiquan were both sentenced to life, with possibility of parole for Latonia after 93 years.
109	10	"Second Best"	Unknown	Unknown	September 19, 2014
In 1991 in Sylmar, California, Dennis Dawley enlisted Brandita "Brandi" Taliano to bludgeon his wife, Joan, with a golf club. Both were sentenced to life in prison without parole. Dennis died on December 3, 2011, at the age of seventy-five, while Brandi was pardoned and released in August of 2018. On May 15, 2010, Nadiyah Venable and her 15-year-old cousin, Aliyah Venable, murdered 29-year-old ShaRon Moens. They threw bleach in ShaRon's eyes and stabbed her 27 times in front of her children. Nadiyah was sentenced to 55 years with no possibility of parole until 2060. As she was a minor, Aliyah's charges were dropped for testifying against Nadiyah. After her sentencing, Nadiyah died of a seizure on July 1, 2014. In New South Wales, Australia, Tanya Lane shot her husband, Steve, and hid his body in the woods. Tanya received a 17-year prison term, and her lover, Renae, charged as an accessory to the killing, was sentenced to four years and is currently free.
110	11	"For the Money, Honey"	Unknown	Unknown	September 26, 2014
In 1991, Melissa Ann Shepard emptied her husband, Gordon Stewart's, bank account before running him over with a car, and was jailed for manslaughter. Her next two husbands, Robert Friedrich and Alexander "Alex" Strategos, also died. Shepard drained both their bank accounts and was sent to jail for theft and forgery. After attempting to murder her fifth husband, Frederick "Fred" Weeks, she was sentenced to three and a half years in prison. Kelly Renee Gissendaner enlisted her lover, Greg Owen, to beat and stab her husband Doug to death in February 1997. While Owen was sentenced to life without parole for 25 years in exchange for his testimony, Gissendaner was sentenced to death and executed on September 30, 2015 (one year and four days after the episode aired). In Charlotte, Tennessee, Ada Wittenmyer fatally poisoned two of her husbands, William "Bill" Hayes and John Wittenmeyer, with arsenic, before attempting to kill a third man in Canada. Convicted of both murders and sentenced to life without parole, she committed suicide in prison in 1984.
111	12	"Cold as Ice"	Unknown	Unknown	October 3, 2014
After forcing him to write a false statement against her ex-husband, Tracey Ann Richter shot her neighbor, Dustin Wehde, nine times and tried to disguise the murder as a home invasion. She was sentenced to life without parole. On October 19, 2012, Melanie Smith set fire to the house of her neighbors, Lee-Anna Shiers and Liam Timbrell, killing them, their son, and two of their nephews. Timbrell's dying words implicated Smith, and she was sentenced to thirty years to life. In September 2010, Rhonda Wisto ordered her gang to beat 15-year-old Dystiny Myers to death. She then had York and Jason Greenwell attempt to murder fellow gang member Cody Miller. Jason was sentenced to 15 years to life and paroled in November 2021. Ty Hill, Miller, York and Wisto were given life without parole for first-degree murder and conspiracy to commit murder.
112	13	"If Looks Could Kill"	Unknown	Unknown	October 10, 2014
In Manhattan, New York, prostitute Angela Murray recruited Aljulah and Hasib Cutts to rob ninety-two-year-old Felix Brinkmann. The three bludgeoned and strangled Brinkmann to death on July 29, 2009. Murray pleaded guilty to second-degree murder and was sentenced to a minimum of sixteen years. Aljulah got twenty-five years to life, while Hasib got fifteen years to life, merely for robbery. In Tucson, Arizona, housekeeper Eva Dugan was convicted of the murder of her employer, Andrew J. Mathis, whom she bludgeoned to death with his own ear trumpet in January of 1927. She is sentenced to death. At her hanging in 1930, she was accidentally decapitated, becoming the last person hanged in the state of Arizona. In Duplin County, North Carolina, Pamela Lanier poisoned her husband, Dorian, with turkey feed on November 19, 1997, to collect on his life insurance. Sentenced to life without parole, she was also suspected of the poisoning and drowning death of her first husband, Johnny Williams.
113	14	"To Have and to Kill"	Unknown	Unknown	October 17, 2014
In February 1985, Gaile Owens hired hitman Sidney Porterfield to kill her husband Ron with a tire iron. Owens and Porterfield were both apprehended and sentenced to death, but Owens's sentence was commuted to life, and she was released on parole in 2011. She died of natural causes on November 27, 2019. In December 2006, Kym Cano shot and killed her husband, California Highway Patrol officer Francisco Cano, hoping to collect his life insurance. Her children testified against her in court, and she was sentenced to 40 years to life. Tyshee Prokop hired her lover's friend, Charles Turnbull, to fatally shoot her husband Gary. Turnbull was sentenced to life in prison and Prokop is eligible for parole in 2032.
114	15	"Mad or Bad"	Unknown	Unknown	October 24, 2014
When Daryl Smith moved to Florida to be with his girlfriend, Andrea Stranko, his former lover, Morgan Smith, shot and killed Stranko and wounded him. Morgan was sentenced to life without parole for Stranko's murder. On New Year's Eve 1975, Sarah "Cindy" White burned down the home of Charles and Carol Robertson, who sexually abused her, similar to her deceased parents, killing them both, as well as their children. Despite showing remorse, she was sentenced to six concurrent life sentences. In August 2000, bipolar urologist Kathleen Hagen asphyxiated her parents, James and Idella, with plastic wrap and pillows in a psychotic rage after years of dysfunction, but later regrets it. She was acquitted of both murders on grounds of insanity and institutionalized for six years. Hagen died on April 18, 2015.
115	16	"Scorned"	Unknown	Unknown	November 7, 2014
On March 13, 2010, Lan Anh Le of Sacramento, California, stabbed her girlfriend, Monica Anderson, ninety-one times after an argument. She was convicted of first-degree murder and sentenced to twenty-five years to life in prison. In Vidor, Texas, Julia Andrews shot her lover Randy Peddy to death on November 28, 2012. Andrews was convicted of first-degree murder and sentenced to forty-four years. After her lover, Claude Tozer, a doctor, broke up with her, Dorothy Mort shot him to death in 1920, also unsuccessfully attempting suicide soon afterwards. She was acquitted of the murder on reason of insanity, lived an uneventful life after this, and died in 1966 at age 81.
116	17	"Total Control"	Unknown	Unknown	November 14, 2014
In Greenville, South Carolina, Carman Major and her husband Clarence Jenkins kidnapped, killed, and dismembered 34-year-old Mekole Harris after she left the polygamus love triangle. Jenkins was sentenced to life without parole, while Major was sentenced to 40 years. Patricia Goddard was a 73-year-old woman and a family friend of Louise O'Brien, an 18-year-old boarding with her. Goddard physically abused O'Brien and murdered her with a hammer in 2008. Goddard buried O'Brien's body in her backyard, but was apprehended and sentenced to three years and nine months in prison. Goddard died in prison. In 1995 in Killaloe, Ontario, Cherrylle Dell and her lover Nancy Fillmore fatally poisoned Dell's husband Scott with antifreeze. When Fillmore informed the police about Scott's death, Cherrylle and a teenage lover, Brent Crawford, killed her. Crawford was convicted of Fillmore's murder and sentenced to life without parole, while Cherylle was charged with Scott's murder and pleaded guilty to Fillmore's, receiving 25 years to life for the former.
117	18	"Hidden Rage"	Unknown	Unknown	November 21, 2014
In Houston, Texas, party girl Ana Lilia Trujillo moves in with Swedish doctor and fellow alcoholic Stefan Andersson, but Stefan soon has enough of Ana's violent temper and kicks her out. After Ana is thrown out of the home of another friend, James Wells, and his girlfriend, Stefan lets her move back in temporarily. On June 9, 2013, after a night of drinking due to previous failed relationships in her life, Ana bludgeons and stabs Stefan twenty-five times with the heel of her shoe, and is serving thirty years to life in prison, and will be eligible for parole at the age of 75. In Flora, Illinois, in 1908, maid Essie Cope marries her newly widowed employer, Havill Bible, in order to justify what others see as immoral behavior. Fifteen years later, Havill also dies, and the cycle repeats: in 1925, Essie is taken in by Ernest and Laura Malinsky, Laura dies, and Essie marries Ernest, seeking higher social status. She confesses to poisoning Laura, Havill, and Havill's first wife, Molly, with arsenic, and is sentenced to life for Laura's murder, but is oddly released after twenty-five years. She died at age ninety-eight. Emotionally troubled Arline Lawless believes that she has found the man of her dreams in handsome Waldoboro, Maine, fisherman Norman "Normy" Benner, but Norman soon ends the relationship over Arline's clingy, needy behavior. On July 21, 2012, Arline shoots Norman in the back of the head and herself in the face, intending to commit suicide, but survives. Some people believed that a serious vehicle accident which caused brain damage could be the contributors to her behavior. She is serving a thirty-five-year sentence for first-degree murder.
118	19	"Two to Terminate"	Unknown	Unknown	November 28, 2014
In 1927, Ada Leboeuf and her lover, Thomas Dreher, hired James Beadle to shoot and kill Leboeuf's husband, James. All three were convicted of first-degree murder. Beadle was sentenced to life without parole, while Leboeuf and Dreher were sentenced to death. Both were executed on February 1, 1929. In early June of 1997, psychiatric nurse Keng Hwee "Kathy" Yeo fatally shot Christopher "Chris" Dorian, a patient whom she was dating, and enlisted her boyfriend, Raymond Galea, to help hide the body after she was dumped by Chris. Yeo was sentenced to eighteen to twenty-four years in prison for first-degree murder, while Galea received five to seven years as an accessory. Yeo was paroled on July 6, 2018, and Galea in October of 2005. In Carthage, Mississippi, Vernice Ballenger enlisted her husband, Mac, to hire two hitmen, James Head and Ronald Ritter, to rob her aunt Myrtle Ellis and set her house on fire. Ellis survived the initial attack, but died of her injuries 10 days later. Mac, Head, and Ritter were all convicted of capital murder, and, in exchange for their testimony, were given life sentences without parole. Vernice was sentenced to death, but died in prison in 2002.
119	20	"In the Family"	Unknown	Unknown	December 5, 2014
In June 1998, Sandi Nieves set fire to her home, letting her four daughters die of smoke inhalation, then attempted to blame her surviving son for the crime. She was initially sentenced to death, but in 2021, her death sentence was commuted to life in prison without parole. Nicole Yesconis enlisted her boyfriend, Jeremiah Wetmore, and his friend, Michael Heath, to murder her father and stepmother, Robert and Aletha, in January 1994. Wetmore was sentenced to life without parole, Heath to 35 years, and Nicole to 40 years to life. After their daughter Shafilea attempted suicide to avoid an arranged marriage, Farzana Ahmed and her husband, Iftikhar Ahmed, suffocated her with a plastic bag on September 11, 2003, and disposed of her body in a river, and swore the rest of their family to secrecy. They were turned in by their surviving daughter and sentenced to 25 years to life.

=== Season 9 (2015) ===
Note: This is the first season of the show to display the mugshots (or artist renditions if they lived before the days of modern photography) of the convicted women after each of their stories are told.

No. overall	No. in season	Title	Directed by	Written by	Original release date
120	1	"Sleeping with the Enemy"	Unknown	Unknown	August 7, 2015
Texan Darlene Gentry is a self-centered former beauty queen who enjoys the party girl lifestyle and whose marriage to husband Keith is collapsing under the debt she has incurred. In November 2005, she shoots Keith in the head while he sleeps, hoping to collect on his $500,000 life insurance policy. She is given a sixty-year sentence. Carol Croydon survived an abusive childhood and grew up to marry wealthy upholsterer Philip Croydon, who showers her with gifts, but the marriage is loveless and both engage in extramarital affairs. In April 2003, Carol lures Philip to a hotel room with the promise of a romantic night out, then stabs him twenty-two times with a cheese knife and claims he was murdered by swingers in a sex game gone wrong. She is sentenced to fifteen years to life. Claire Christine Welsh is a former cheerleader and valedictorian who finds the love of her life in handsome and athletic Jack Mileski, but she has borderline personality disorder and her affection soon turns to jealous obsession, even faking a pregnancy, which is the last straw for Jack. In January 1997, she shoots Jack in the head while he sleeps and then shoots herself in the chest, but survives. Despite Claire knowing what she did was wrong, she is serving life without parole.
121	2	"D.I.Y. Orphans"	Unknown	Unknown	August 14, 2015
When teenager Patricia "Patty" Columbo begins a sexual relationship with married pharmacist Frank DeLuca, her parents, Frank and Mary, with whom she has a strained relationship, are not pleased. After her father assaults her lover, Patty convinces DeLuca to help her murder her parents and younger brother, Michael, promising him a cut of her inheritance. Both were sentenced to 200-300 years for her parents' and brother's murders, 150 years for conspiracy to commit each murder, and fifty years for solicitation for murder. Columbo has been denied parole more than fifteen times, while DeLuca, after many denials of his own, died in prison on January 4, 2023, at the age of eighty-four. Susan Edwards and her beloved, devoted husband, Christopher, are movie enthusiasts who are substantially in debt from collecting Hollywood memorabilia, and Susan hates her parents, William and Patricia Wycherley, for taking her inheritance. On May 4, 1998, the couple shoot the Wycherleys to death, then steal the victims' money and concoct a ruse to convince family and friends that they are still alive. Sixteen years later, Christopher confesses, and he and his wife Susan receive twenty-five years to life. In Fairfield, New Jersey, social status seeker Tina Lunney enjoys keeping up with the Joneses. However, her spending puts her into substantial debt. She can always rely on her mother, Marie Zoppi, to lend her money -- until July 22, 2009 (erroneously said to be 1999 on the show), when Marie stops the money train. Tina strangles Marie with a necktie and disguises the murder as a suicide so she can use her mother's money to repay her debts. She then goes into hiding for two days before her conscience gets the better of her, and she turns herself in. She is sentenced to forty years in prison and will be her mother's age (eighty-one) when released.
122	3	"Gamble Lives Away"	Unknown	Unknown	August 21, 2015
Nicole Vonlee Titlow is a transgender woman who needs money for sex reassignment surgery. Her aunt, Billie Jean Rogers, is a gambling addict who loses up to $20,000 a night at casinos, and her alcoholic millionaire husband, Don, has threatened her with divorce. On August 12, 2000, Billie Jean enlists Nicole to help her murder Don with the promise of money for her surgery, and Nicole proceeds to try and poison Don by force feeding him more alcohol while he's already dead drunk, before Billie finishes the job by smothering Don with a pillow. Nicole serves a twenty-to-forty-year sentence in a male prison before being paroled on July 13, 2021. With no direct evidence against Billie Jean, she is acquitted, but nature (and possibly fate) doles out its own form of justice when she dies of cancer six months later. Sandra Barajas's marriage to husband Miguel "Mike" Barajas is on the rocks because of her adult daughter, Dawn Richburg, a meth addict who still lives at home. When Mike decides to divorce her, Dawn and Sandra desire to take his life insurance money to support Sandra's gambling addiction, and Dawn enlists her drug supplier, Tommy Wright, to murder Mike and disguise it as a home invasion. Tommy is sentenced to forty years, Dawn to thirty-five years, and Sandra to life in prison without parole. In Levering, Michigan, Amber Rose Smith and her fiancé, Trenton "Trent" Mallory, who successfully raised thousands of dollars from the public for treatment of their son, Marshall's, rare heart condition, are in dire financial straits due to Amber's compulsive gambling. Fearing her demons will be exposed and believing that the couple's debts will be forgiven if Trent is dead, Amber shoots him in the head while he sleeps on March 6, 2014. She is caught very quickly and is convicted of first-degree murder, serving life in prison without parole.
123	4	"Green-Eyed Monsters"	Unknown	Unknown	August 28, 2015
In Ventura, California, Diana Haun, shy and unlucky in love, begins a hot, passionate affair with womanizer Michael Dally, despite the fact that Michael is married, and his wife, Sherri, refuses to give him up. When Sherri threatens Diana with physical harm, Diana and Michael plan Sherri's murder as a "human sacrifice" for Michael's birthday, and Diana carries out the plan in May 1996, kidnapping and stabbing Sherri to death. In Jerome, Pennsylvania, nursing home assistants Erin Nicole Everett and Tory Minnick begin a relationship, despite Erin's conservative Christian upbringing. The two women get engaged, but Tory still has feelings for her ex-boyfriend and soon breaks off the engagement to return to him. In March 2011, Erin shoots Tory twice in the head, smashes her face with a hammer, and tries to disguise the murder as a home invasion. Patricia Rorrer is an accomplished equestrian with a reputation as a confrontational bully. She seeks to rekindle her relationship with ex-boyfriend, Andrew "Andy" Katrinak, who is now married to his wife, Joann, and has an infant son, Alex. But Andy rejects her, and Joann tells her to leave Andy alone. This sends Patricia over the edge, and in December 1994, she kidnaps and murders Joann and Alex to punish Andy for rejecting her. All three women (plus Michael Dally) are serving life sentences without parole. All have appealed their sentences (with Everett having done so twice), but none have been successful.
124	5	"Payback"	Unknown	Unknown	September 4, 2015
In July 2011, high school dropout and drug addict Nadia Palacios and her drug-dealer boyfriend, Roberto Guzman, are attacked by four masked black men, and Nadia is sexually assaulted. Nadia and Roberto suspect Roberto's client, David Campbell, of the assault, and lure him away to be sadistically tortured and murdered. A year later, Nadia confesses, only to learn that Campbell was innocent of the rape, and is sentenced to forty years in prison. Her three cohorts receive sentences of anything between twenty-nine and fifty-nine years. At the age of twelve, Juana Barraza's mother gave her away to a man who used her as a sex slave. In her forties, Barraza is a popular professional wrestler in Mexico City known as "the Silent Lady", and has a secret identity as serial killer "La Mataviejitas" (the Old Lady Killer), strangling elderly women to take vicarious revenge on her now-deceased mother. She is convicted of eleven murders and sentenced to 759 years in prison, but may have claimed as many as forty lives. Donna Casagrande, an Australian prostitute and drug addict with a troubled past, is taken in by John "Joanne" Lillecrapp, who believes that she can rehabilitate her. But when Donna meets her lover, Nicole McGuinness, who comes from a similar background, she falls back into her old ways, and the two women steal from Joanne to support their heroin addiction. In November 2001, afraid that Joanne will turn them in to the police, the women stab her to death and dismember her body. Donna confesses to the murder and serves ten years for manslaughter, while Nicole receives a life sentence with the possibility of parole in 2019. She is released in 2021.
125	6	"Get Rich Quick"	Unknown	Unknown	September 11, 2015
Hunter and Tracey Grissom's marriage falls apart due to her hot temper and prescription drug abuse. Hunter finds a new girlfriend, but Tracey charms her way back into his bed, and then accuses him of raping her, but her case crumbles under closer scrutiny. To keep from being exposed as a liar and to collect on his life insurance, Tracey shoots Hunter four times in May 2012, but her effort is for nothing, as she still ends up getting exposed for not just her lies, but for her crime, as Hunter's friends witnessed the murder. She is sentenced to twenty-five years. Jamila M'Barek rises from high-class call girl and Playboy model to countess when she marries the Earl of Shaftesbury Anthony Ashley-Cooper, but the couple split when she fakes a pregnancy. As long as they are not divorced, Jamila can keep spending his money, but when the Earl finds a new girlfriend and decides to divorce her, she enlists her brother Mohammed to beat and strangle him to death in November 2004. Both receive twenty-five-year sentences; Jamila's is later reduced to twenty years. Shayne Alicia Lovera's life has been one of scandal—when she was a teenager, her banker stepfather died by suicide in the face of malpractice allegations, and as a young wife and mother living in Gatlinburg, Tennessee, she openly cheats on her husband, Kelly, and neglects her children. In November 1994, Shayne and her lover, Brett Rae, bludgeon Kelly to death with her son's baseball bat and try to disguise the murder as a traffic accident. Both are serving life sentences with a minimum of twenty-five years. Shayne is paroled in January of 2022 after serving her minimum of twenty-five years, while Brett's first bid for parole is denied in 2023.
126	7	"Two to Kill"	Unknown	Unknown	September 18, 2015
When Detroit, Michigan, high school students Larketa Collier and Sharon Patterson fall in love, Larketa's conservative mother, Sandra, and grandmother, Bertha Atkins, become furious, and eventually decide to bar Sharon from the house when she disrespects them too many times. On September 17, 2003, the desperate teens viciously beat sixty-four-year-old Bertha to death with a claw hammer after she catches them having sex and threatens to have Sharon arrested, and torch the house to destroy her body, but are seen leaving by a neighbor. Both girls are sentenced to life in prison without parole, with Larketa getting an additional four to twenty years for arson and conspiracy. On appeal, Sharon is resentenced to forty to sixty years, and Larketa is resentenced to thirty-eight to forty years after completing her time for her arson charge. English rose Christina Button has expensive tastes and a husband, George, who caters to her every desire, even as her spendthrift ways plunge the couple into debt. Far from being grateful, Christina, on March 3, 2003, enlists her twenty-year-old nephew, Simon Tannahill, to beat George to death with a blunt object so she can collect on his life insurance and repay her debts. Simon is sentenced to life, but has been eligible for parole since 2016, while Christina is sentenced to fourteen years to life and is released in 2019. In Novinger, Missouri, Elain Kay Young is on her fourth marriage with Iraq war veteran Melvin Griesbaum. When Melvin refuses to co-sign on a loan to save her farm, Elain, lying that Melvin is physically abusing her, manipulates close friend Katherine Mock into helping her kill Melvin on March 23, 2006, so she can collect on his $600,000 life insurance policy. She gets away with her crimes for two years before a farmhand comes forward with the revelation that Elain once offered him $10,000 to kill Melvin instead in exchange for her killing his wife. Elain and Katherine are serving two concurrent life sentences without parole, and Elain is also suspected in the suspicious death of her own mother several years earlier.
127	8	"Never Too Old"	Unknown	Unknown	September 25, 2015
Fred and Sandra Layne of Detroit, Michigan, are raising their troubled, drug-addicted grandson, 17-year-old Jonathan Hoffman, while his parents care for his sick sister in Arizona. Sandra, a 75-year-old retired teacher, attempts to control Jonathan's every move, but is ill-equipped to deal with his rebellious behavior. After Jonathan fails a drug test and announces he is running away, Sandra fatally shoots him five times and tries to claim self-defense, but the act is caught on Jonathan's 911 call. Sandra is convicted of second-degree murder and given a minimum twenty-two-year sentence. Romance blossoms in an Atlanta, Georgia senior-living community between recent newcomer Lena Driskell, 78, and smooth-talking grandfather Herman Winslow, 85, but Herman's charisma is well known, and despite remaining faithful to Lena, his relentless charm keeps indirectly attracting other women and she constantly believes otherwise. Herman soon has enough of Lena's jealousy and temper and finds a new girlfriend, and Lena responds by attacking him in his room, and when he runs downstairs for help, she follows and shoots him in the head four times in front of a security guard. Unrepentant, Lena is sentenced to ten years in prison, but released in 2011 after serving five years. In Waco, Texas, Rowena Ledbetter has been married seven times by age 70, when she meets Herman Wilson, whom she convinces to make her the beneficiary of his will—without disclosing that she is still married to her seventh husband, Cecil Forson. On April 21, 2002, she poisons Herman's breakfast with pesticide. Herman's dying words implicate Rowena, and she is given a life sentence, and chokes to death in prison after serving only nine months.
128	9	"Forever and a Day"	Unknown	Unknown	October 9, 2015
In Colbert, Georgia, Tracy Lea Fortson and her boyfriend, Doug Benton, share a love of lifting weights and hunting, but Tracy is jealous of Doug's friends and has a history of violence against boyfriends, and their relationship turns volatile and violent. When Doug ends the relationship, Tracy responds by shooting him in the head and stabbing him in the genitals repeatedly in June 2000. She is sentenced to life without parole, plus an additional five years for tampering with evidence. In Whitehall Township, Pennsylvania, Na Cola Franklin had dreamt of having a lavish wedding since childhood, but her truck-driving fiancé, Billy Brewster, insists on more simple nuptials and forces her to make all the preparations herself while he works and parties. On the early morning of their wedding day in August 2012, an argument between the two turns violent, and a stressed and sleep-deprived Na Cola stabs Billy in the heart. She receives a life sentence without parole after refusing a deal that would have given her a lighter sentence. In July 2008, Australian Angela Maree Williams' common-law husband of twenty-three years, Doug Kally, allegedly vanished during a fishing trip, and Angela began a relationship with Doug's best friend, David Grainger. Four years later, Angela's dark secret is exposed: fed up from twenty-three years of emotional and physical abuse from Doug, she struck him sixteen times with a pickax and buried his body in her backyard. Claiming self-defense, she is convicted of defensive homicide and given an eight-year sentence.
129	10	"Red Hot Temper"	Unknown	Unknown	October 16, 2015
Brandy Holmes, a woman with a history of violence who was born with fetal alcohol syndrome, meets Robert Coleman, a career criminal. In 2003, the couple decide to rob and kill retired Pastor Julian Brandon and his wife Alice. Alice survives the attack, but just days later, Brandy and Robert murder their friend Terrence Blaze in a thrill killing. Both are sentenced to death in 2005. Brandy's death sentence was commuted to life in prison without parole. In 1907, Stella Lipczynska, a Polish immigrant working as a housekeeper at a Catholic convent in northern Michigan, suspects a love affair between Sister Mary Janina and the pastor of the convent, Father Andrew Bieniawski, and seethes with hatred for both for violating their holy vows. Seeing herself as an avenging angel, she bludgeons Sister Janina in the head with a shovel and then buries her alive. Later, Stella reveals the murder in a confession, and when Sister Janina's body is found 10 years later, it is revealed that the nun was pregnant, confirming Stella's suspicions. In 1919, Stella is given a life sentence, before being released in 1927. In northern Ireland, Karen Walsh, a successful mother, wife and pharmacist, falls into alcoholism and tries to convince her 81-year-old neighbor, widow Marie Rankin, to drink with her. Karen's alcoholism escalates, and when she shows up at Marie's house with a bottle of vodka on Christmas Eve 2008, Marie asks her to leave. In a drunken rage, Karen bludgeons Marie to death and then rapes her with a crucifix. In 2011, she is sentenced to 28 years in prison.
130	11	"Murder for Me"	Unknown	Unknown	October 23, 2015
Monique Susanne Wheeler is an immature, impulsive young woman. When her husband, Paul Berkley, leaves for a tour of duty in Iraq, she begins an affair with her teenage stepson's friend, Andrew Canty, 18. Upon Paul's return home, Monique enlists Andrew and a friend to murder Paul to collect on his $400,000 life insurance policy. Both Monique and Andrew faced the death penalty, but instead were sentenced to life without parole. Co-workers Wendy Evans and Katie Foreman bond over their troubles with men, but when Katie begins dating Wendy's ex-boyfriend, the friendship is over, and Wendy wants revenge. With Katie's ex, Bradley Rawlinson, as mastermind, Wendy and accomplice Bernard Spicer plan Katie's murder, and set Katie's home on fire in October 2011. Katie dies of smoke inhalation, and Wendy and her cohorts are sent to prison, with Wendy sentenced to 18 to 24 years. Mary Rogers' marriage to husband Marcus is turbulent and violent, but despite Mary's constant abuse, Marcus still loves her. Mary, however, has her eye on wealthy boarder Morris Knapp, and convinces her teenage lover, Leon Perham, to help her kill Marcus. In August 1902, the lovers lure Marcus into a trap and then tie his hands, disable him with chloroform, and drown him in the nearby river. Leon is sentenced to life, and Mary is hanged in 1905, becoming the last woman executed in Vermont.
131	12	"Girl on Girl"	Unknown	Unknown	October 30, 2015
Kimberly Diane Cargill's relationships never last long due to her violent temper and abusive behavior, and she constantly wars with the fathers of her four children. Having lost custody of three kids due to abuse and in danger of losing the fourth, Kim fears the court testimony of her hired babysitter, Cherry Walker, will seal her fate, and on June 18, 2010, she kills Cherry and burns the body. She is sentenced to death and loses her appeal on her death sentence in April 2017. In South London, Rebecca Douglas and Sierra Leonean immigrant Julie Sheriff are troubled teens whose friendship turns to hatred when they end up in rival gangs. Suspecting Julie of spreading rumors about her sex life on social media, Rebecca stabs Julie in the head with a hair comb in May 2011. Julie dies after five months in a coma, and Rebecca is serving 10 years to life in prison. In 1870s rural Georgia, Kath Hamrick Southern and Narcissa "Sis" Fowler have their eyes on the same man, Bob Southern, as a potential husband, but as Sis is already married, Bob marries Kath. Sis spreads rumors that Kath is cheating on Bob, leaving Kath's reputation in ruins. The feud comes to a head at a hoedown, when a fight between the women culminates in Kath stabbing Sis to death. Kath is sentenced to be hanged, but is eventually pardoned by the state governor as a favor to her family.
132	13	"The Vulnerable"	Unknown	Unknown	November 6, 2015
Sara Moore becomes a live-in caretaker for elderly multiple sclerosis victim Richard Englander, but is more interested in his money than in his welfare and drains his bank accounts to support her crack cocaine habit. On February 6, 2014, Richard decides to fire her after only five days and notifies the police, and Sara bludgeons him with a tire iron and stabs him in the neck. She pleads guilty to second-degree murder and is sentenced to 25 years to life. Latvian immigrant Angelika Gavare is a single mom working as a clerk in suburban Adelaide, Australia, who dreams of the good life. In December 2008, after stealing petty cash from her customers proves insufficient, she goes after 82-year-old Vonne McGlynn, bludgeoning her to death and dismembering the corpse so she can steal the elderly woman's money. She receives 32 years to life; Vonne's head and hands are still missing. Denise Goodwin is hired to care for lung cancer patient Carolyn Rabourn, and also bonds with Carolyn's husband, Gerald, who makes her a signatory of his bank accounts after learning she is a trustee. He little suspects Denise's credentials as a trustee are forged and that she has a history of taking advantage of the elderly. Three weeks after his wife's death, Gerald disappears, and Denise eventually steals $600,000 from the Rabourns. Gerald's body is never found, but Denise nevertheless receives life without parole for fraud and first degree murder.

=== Season 10 (2016) ===
No. overall	No. in season	Title	Directed by	Written by	Original release date
133	1	"Killer Cougars"	Unknown	Unknown	August 27, 2016
Canadian doctor Shirley Turner begins a relationship with American medical student Andrew Bagby, thirteen years her junior. Shirley has borderline personality disorder and has a long history of failed relationships due to her violent, jealous behavior, and when Andrew ends the relationship for good, his fate is sealed. On November 5, 2001, Shirley, who had recently become pregnant with Andrew's child, shoots him five times. She never faces justice, ending her life in August 2003 by drowning herself and her infant son, Zachary, in the Atlantic Ocean. Allison Miller is a young single mother who looks after her two sons until she meets Jasper "Pig" Thomas. She falls head over heels as he moves into her house, but he does not share the same feelings as she does, preferring to have drugs, alcohol, avoid important responsibilities and also have affairs with other women. After getting punched in the face by an intoxicated Jasper, Allison shoots him with a .22-caliber revolver to punish him, but later regrets her action. She will be eligible for parole after serving twenty years for manslaughter. Gina Spann loves being the center of attention and has a devoted partner in husband Kevin. She repays Kevin's devotion by faking a pregnancy and having multiple affairs, even moving one of her lovers into the marital home. In 1997, when Kevin decides to file for divorce, Gina, fearing financial ruin, enlists her teenage lover, Larry Kelly, and his friends, Gerald Horne and Matthew Piazzi, to shoot him to death. All four are serving life sentences without parole, with Larry and Gina also getting an additional five years.
134	2	"Granny Gets a Gun"	Unknown	Unknown	September 3, 2016
Officer-in-training Alex Reyes' marriage to wife Leslie crumbles after only six months, and Leslie and the couple's infant son move in with her grandmother, Jean Allen, 81, who dislikes Alex due to his Mexican heritage. Jean and Leslie falsely accuse Alex of molesting the boy in a plot to get Leslie full custody, and before Alex can have his day in court, Jean strikes first, shooting Alex to death in January 2006. Unrepentant, she pleads guilty, gets twenty-five years to life for first-degree murder, and, forsaken by her family for all of her lies, dies alone in prison in 2010. When Texan "Big" Joe Sturdivant retires from his transmission repair business for health reasons, his wife Joyce Sturdivant, 62, takes over the company. The "Queen Bee" embezzles money from the business to support her opiate addiction and soon owes tens of thousands in back taxes. To keep her husband from finding out and to benefit from his life insurance, Joyce shoots Big Joe to death in October 2008. She is sentenced to thirty years in prison. Oklahomans Benny and Barbara Ann Scott move to Florida to spend their golden years together, but Benny has congestive heart failure and relies on Barbara. In January 2012, tired of being her husband's caregiver, Barbara shoots Benny in the back of the head and buries his body in her herb garden, then spreads various conflicting stories about his whereabouts. She is sentenced to life without parole and dies in prison in 2015.
135	3	"Bad To The Bone"	Unknown	Unknown	September 10, 2016
In Coats, North Carolina, eighteen-year-old Miranda Dean Barbour is newly married with an infant daughter and an Internet business charging men for chats and companionship, but she is also a child sexual abuse survivor and an avowed Satanist who lures her husband, Elytte, into her faith. On November 11, 2013, the couple entrap and murder Troy LaFerrara by stabbing him twenty times. Both are found guilty of second-degree murder and are serving life without parole, although Miranda claims to have committed at least twenty-two other murders, a claim which has not been substantiated. In Chorley, England, Sharon Edwards lives the good life as fiancée and then wife to successful criminal defence attorney David, but she has a history of abusive and violent behavior against boyfriends, and David is no exception, especially after he loses his job. On August 23, 2015, after only two months of marriage, Sharon fatally stabs David in the heart. She is serving a minimum twenty-year sentence. In 1930s Shreveport, Louisiana, Toni Jo Henry is a prostitute and heroin addict struggling to overcome a troubled childhood. Marrying Claude "Cowboy" Henry in Austin, Texas, Cowboy is sent to prison for murder, and Toni Jo and friend Arkie Burks plot to break him out of jail. On February 14, 1940, they rob and murder good Samaritan Joseph P. Calloway in an attempt to rob a bank, but Toni Jo is turned in by her uncle. Both Toni Jo and Arkie are sentenced to death, and Toni Jo is executed by electric chair in November 1942, ironically leaving Cowboy to remain in prison. Arkie is executed four months later, in March 1943.
136	4	"Cling 'Til Death"	Unknown	Unknown	September 17, 2016
In Denver, Colorado, Darcy Matlock's first marriage ends due to her extramarital affair, and she finds comfort in the arms of her new boyfriend, Ron Griffin, but this relationship is also short-lived due to her erratic and jealous behavior. When Ron marries his new girlfriend, Andrean "Andie" Hanks, Darcy decides to destroy his life by shooting Andie to death on December 6, 1993, but is turned in by her ex-husband after she confesses the crime to him. His life indeed destroyed, a grieving Ron commits suicide two months after the murder, and Darcy is serving life in prison without parole. In San Diego, California, Navy recruit Vegas Bray suffered from an unhappy childhood, which stalled her emotional development. As an adult, she is possessive of her boyfriend, fellow recruit Victor Saucedo, and tries to isolate him from having anyone in his life, including his son, which proves to be the tipping point for him. After Victor leaves her, Vegas shoots him nine times, killing him, on October 16, 2012. She is sentenced to fifty years to life. In Manchester, England, dental student Harmohinder "Mindy" Kaur Sanghera falls in love with businessman Sair Ali, even converting to Islam to be with him despite her Sikh background. After Sair marries his cousin, Sana, he allows Mindy to become his "temporary second wife" due to an Islamic religious provision, but ends this arrangement once Sana becomes pregnant. On May 11, 2007, Mindy stabs Sana forty-three times and also plunges the knife into her womb to kill the unborn baby. She is sentenced to fourteen years to life, and to this day, she and her legal team maintain her innocence despite the overwhelming evidence against her.
137	5	"Sugar and Spite"	Unknown	Unknown	September 24, 2016
Teresa Perez is an attractive car salesman who enjoys manipulating men to get what she wants for herself and her young daughter, which is the finer things in life without having to pay for them. She moves to Denver and falls in love with Justyn Rosen, a married man twice her age, but after seven years of dating, Justyn ends the relationship to return to his wife and gets a restraining order against her. In October 2003, Teresa kidnaps Justyn, resulting in a violent standoff at the local police station in which she shoots Justyn eleven times, killing him, and is herself killed by police shortly afterwards. Texan Brian Allen is a successful self-made businessman, but no matter what, he cannot please his wife, Karra Trichele Allen, who has bipolar disorder that causes violent mood swings, especially when she drinks. Despite Trichele's contempt for Brian, she does not want to lose him, and on July 1, 2013, when Brian decides to divorce her, she responds by shooting him to death. She is serving life behind bars without the possibility of parole. In their parents' acrimonious divorce, Welsh teens Ashleigh and Holly Robinson side with their mother, Joanne, and bear a grudge against their father, Tony, for allegedly hoarding their mother's jewelry and some cash. The resulting rift culminates in the girls plotting with their boyfriends, Gordon Harding and Sacha Roberts, to murder Tony in his sleep so they can collect on their inheritance. Both boys receive life sentences, while Ashleigh receives 22 years minimum, and Holly receives 18 years minimum; Joanne also serves four years for obstructing justice.
138	6	"Cash In"	Unknown	Unknown	October 1, 2016
Susan Lee Russo's facade of devoted wife and mother masks her dark side: she is a meth addict and is having an affair with her drug dealer, Jason Andrews. Feeling smothered by her husband, David, and wanting his life insurance money, she employs Andrews and fellow drug dealer Bobby Morris to shoot David to death in July 1994. Both men get twenty-five years to life, and Susan receives life without parole. Later, Russo's sentence was changed to twenty-five years to life and was denied parole in June 2018. On September 29, 2022, Russo died of natural causes while still serving her sentence. In Nottingham, England, Dorothea Nancy Waddingham starts her own nursing home, despite lack of medical training and false credentials as a nurse, but finds caring for elderly patient Louisa Baguley and her daughter, Ada, too strenuous. Louisa and Ada die within a few months of each other in 1935, Ada after making Dorothea the sole beneficiary of her will. It is discovered that Dorothea poisoned both women with morphine, and she is sentenced to death and hanged on April 16, 1936. Petty criminals Alvin and Darlene Spears move from Louisiana to Colorado to make a fresh start, and Alvin begins studying to become a minister, but money is too tight for Darlene's shopaholic lifestyle. With her sights set on Alvin's life insurance money, Darlene bludgeons and stabs her husband to death in December 2003. She is serving life in prison without parole, plus forty-eight years for conspiracy to commit murder.
139	7	"Killer-in-Laws"	Unknown	Unknown	October 8, 2016
Having quit her college teaching job and with her husband unemployed and the family in need of money, Katey Passaniti begins to prey on her Alzheimer's-afflicted mother and stepfather, Ernest and Loretta Luttrell. When Katey's plan to have Ernest permanently committed to an Alzheimer's unit fails, she manipulates her own unwitting mother and her parents' housekeeper Tina Van Moerquerk into hiring hitman Erick Crain to shoot Ernest to death on July 25, 2010. Loretta is deemed unfit to stand trial, and Tina, Erick and Katey are all serving life without parole, with Katey also getting an additional 70 years for conspiracy and forgery. In 1950s Kentucky, Opal Juanita Collins and paraplegic World War II veteran Ben Collins Jr. begin a whirlwind romance, leading to bad blood between herself and Ben's family, especially his mother and caretaker, Julia. After the couple marry and move in with Ben's family, the clashes escalate, and in March 1956, a jealous Opal shoots Julia, Ben, and Ben's sisters, Mary Sue and Martha Ann, to death. Prosecuted for the murder of eleven-year-old Mary Sue, Opal is sentenced to death, which is later commuted to life in prison without parole. When Rajvinder Kaur's husband, Iqbal, leaves India for England on a work visa, Rajvinder is stuck looking after her mother-in-law, Baljit, who constantly criticizes and demeans Rajvinder and orders her around. Rajvinder escapes when she leaves India to re-join her husband, but when Baljit comes to England for a six-month visit, the cycle begins again until Rajvinder decides enough is enough. In February 2011, Rajvinder bludgeons Baljit to death with a rolling pin. The court is sympathetic to the circumstances leading up to the murder, and she is given a fairly light sentence of eleven years to life.
140	8	"Suspicious Minds"	Unknown	Unknown	October 22, 2016
Former high school golden girl and social worker Kimethia "Kim" Coleman falls head over heels in love with Air Force sergeant Brian Spinks, but is hotly jealous and suspects him of infidelity. On January 17, 2010, after one confrontation too many, Brian ends the relationship, and Kim, who is not used to rejection, responds by stabbing him over sixty times and slashing his throat. Brian's death is caught on Kim's 911 call, and Kim is sentenced to life without parole. Alicia Ernst is bubbly and popular, while her best friend since middle school, Stephanie Erends, is troubled, insecure, and self-medicates with drugs and booze. Stephanie is convinced that Alicia stole her boyfriend, Alex, and at Stephanie's meth-fueled birthday party in March 2008, after Alicia unintentionally makes some cruel jokes at Stephanie's expense, Stephanie makes her accusation before slitting Alicia's throat with a wallpaper scraper, killing her. As Stephanie is convicted of the murder, Alex reveals he had never met Alicia before and denounces her for her actions, leaving a heartbroken Stephanie to realize that she killed her best friend over nothing and serve life in prison without parole for her troubles. Victoria Mendoza and her girlfriend, Tawnee Baird, forged their relationship in juvenile hall as teenagers. Victoria moves in with Tawnee, but is fiercely jealous, and the romance turns tumultuous and violent. In October 2014, suspecting Tawnee of cheating on her, Victoria stabs her lover over forty times in a jealous rage. She is sentenced to sixteen years to life.
141	9	"Unspeakable Acts"	Unknown	Unknown	November 5, 2016
In Edmond, Oklahoma, Delpha Jo Spunaugle is on her fourth marriage, and her union with husband Dennis is troubled due to Dennis's alcoholism, abuse, and infidelity. A repentant Dennis pledges to save the marriage, but Delpha Jo wants his $150,000 life insurance policy more, and on August 14, 1993, she has the couple's live-in handyman, David Woodward, bludgeon, stab, and ultimately strangle him to death. Both murderers get caught very quickly and are sentenced to life without parole, with Delpha Jo taking a plea for the sentence to avoid the death penalty. Recently widowed chef Cai Xia Liao is smitten with recently separated Chinese-born Australian businessman Brian Mach. Brian promises to bring Cai Xia to live in Melbourne, Australia, with him as his new wife, but ultimately reneges when his ex-wife Mai convinces him to reconcile. Cai Xia takes her revenge by beating and torturing Brian and murdering Mai and their four-year-old grandson, Alistair, with garden shears. She is caught by the police while lying in wait to murder Brian's daughter (Alistair's mother), as well. She is serving thirty-two years to life. After a thirty-year marriage, schoolteacher Nancy Larios of San Pedro, California, has fallen out of love with her husband, Luis, but not with his money. After squandering his $90,000 inheritance and taking out a $425,000 life insurance on him, on April 22, 2004, she drugs Luis and kills him, trying to disguise the crime as a freak accident. Nancy is now serving life without parole.
142	10	"DIY Burial"	Unknown	Unknown	November 12, 2016
Danielle Green is an aspiring equestrian with dreams of Olympic gold, and marries her second husband, Raymond, to use his money to achieve her goal. She isolates him from his family and drains his bank accounts, but when financial hardships leave the couple penniless, Raymond is no longer of use to her. With a rich new boyfriend in the wings, Danielle shoots Raymond ten times in May 2014 and stuffs his body into a toolbox. Her sentence is sixty years. New York bankers Patricia Silberstein and Anthony "Tony" Wojcik move in together as a couple, but their happiness is short-lived, as Tony is an abusive, out-of-control alcoholic who cheats on Patricia, and continues to stalk and harass her even after Patricia leaves him. One night in May 1976, a violent confrontation between the two ends with Patricia killing him. Originally, her sentence was made by her how old she was on the day of the murder: twenty-two years, seven months, and six days. She is ultimately given a fifteen-year sentence, which she serves, and dies three years after her release. Twice-divorced Englishwoman Ann Browning begins an on-again, off-again romantic relationship with elderly widower Bill Williamson despite their age difference. After they reconcile, Ann convinces Bill to sell his home, deposit the proceeds in their joint bank account, and move in with her, but she has no intention of growing old with him. On September 10, 2010, hungry for Bill's money, she beats him to death with a baseball bat and buries him in her backyard. She is serving twenty-five years to life.
143	11	"Anger Mismanagement"	Unknown	Unknown	November 19, 2016
Tomiekia Johnson grew up in the tough Los Angeles suburb of Compton, but ends up on the right side of the law when she becomes a California Highway Patrol officer. However, she has a hot temper fueled by alcohol, and her relationship with her husband, Marcus Lemons, is becoming strained. During an argument on February 21, 2009, Tomiekia beats Marcus, and then shoots him in the head, killing him, getting away with the crime for two years by using a self-defense excuse until the coroner finally determines the truth. She is convicted of first-degree murder and is now serving fifty years to life in prison. In 1860s Herkimer County, New York, Roxalana Druse thought that she was marrying into money when she wed her husband, William, but instead marries into twenty years of financial hardships, as well as cruelty and verbal abuse from her spouse. On December 18, 1886, after William threatens Roxalana, she enlists the help of her daughter, Mary, and her nephew, Franklin "Frank" Gates, in murdering her husband, shooting, decapitating, and dismembering him before then burning his corpse. The crime is exposed when a rattled Frank confesses all, and his testimony keeps him from facing any charges. Mary receives a life sentence for second-degree murder, and Roxalana, as the mastermind, is hanged in 1889. Chinese immigrant Huajiao Zhuang moves in with her son, Peter, and his wife, Selina, in Melbourne, Australia, to help care for their new baby. However, her old-world Chinese culture clashes with Selina's more modernized ways, and the women are constantly at each other's throats, and Huajiao even tries to arrange a new marriage for her son. On May 3, 2012, Huajiao bludgeons her daughter-in-law to death with a hammer in front of her grandson and disposes of Selina's body in a creek. When her crime is exposed, Huajiao's relationship with Peter is destroyed, and she is sentenced to seventeen years in prison, and upon release, she will be deported back to China in disgrace.
144	12	"Love Leaves Town"	Unknown	Unknown	November 25, 2016
When Katrina Bridges gets pregnant, she and her boyfriend Chris Ingraham move to Jonesboro, Maine, to make a fresh start. However, Katrina is a kleptomaniac who steals money from her family, her friends, Chris, and even his family. She even goes so far as to stage a burglary in her own home to cover up her thefts, which is the last straw for Chris. On January 2, 2001, after taking out a $15,000 life insurance policy on him, Katrina shoots Chris in the head while he sleeps, then leaves him to die as she flees their house with their son to establish an alibi. She is caught very quickly, convicted, and sentenced to forty-seven years. In Diamond Bar, California, Carmen Montenegro is financially supported by her boyfriend and later fiancé, Samuel "Sam" Wiggins, but far from being grateful, she steals additional money from him. Sam finally has enough and breaks off the relationship in April of 2011, which sends Carmen into a murderous rage as she stabs him twenty-four times, then dismembers his corpse with a chainsaw and deposits the remains in various places, including in two potted plants that she gifts to her cousin for Mother's Day. She is eventually caught in the act of moving Sam's remains by the police, and upon her conviction, she gets twenty-six years to life in prison. In Adelaide, Australia, Julie Michelle Dunn is embroiled in a love triangle. She lives with boyfriend Graham Wilkes, but still has feelings for her ex, Greg Havey, who is jailed for assaulting Graham. On December 3, 2003, with Greg's release date imminent, she resolves the dilemma by drugging Graham's curried egg sandwich with sedatives and then bludgeoning him three times in the head while he is disabled, then tries to pin the murder on her son. This is her undoing, as he gives her up quickly. She is given a sentence of life with a minimum of eighteen years. She dies on September 11, 2019, of pancreatic failure while serving her sentence.
145	13	"Friends To Foes"	Unknown	Unknown	November 26, 2016
When Molly Martel's boyfriend becomes physically abusive, her best friend, Stephanie Campbell, is there to support her, but when Stephanie herself becomes a victim of domestic violence, Molly fails to return the favor, and instead sides with Stephanie's abuser, ending the friendship for good. On November 2, 2010, a violent confrontation between the former friends leads to Molly stabbing Stephanie four times. Molly is convicted of second-degree murder and gets 20 to 40 years. Shauna Hoare and her boyfriend, Nathan Matthews, get sexual kicks out of violent schoolgirl-rape pornography, and plot to make their sexual fantasies come true by abducting and raping Nathan's 16-year-old stepsister, Becky Watts. However, instead of kidnapping Becky, Nathan instead strangles her, and then he and Shauna dismember her corpse on February 19, 2015. Nathan is serving a 33-year minimum sentence and Shauna's sentence is 17 years for manslaughter. In Cleveland, Ohio in 1952, preacher's wife Betty Butler loses her family and becomes an outcast in her community for engaging in lesbian extramarital affairs. Upon returning to her hometown of Cincinnati, she finds a helping hand in married woman Evelyn Clark, but Evelyn pays Betty to sleep with her, leaving Betty feeling like a sex slave and wanting out of the relationship. In October 1952, when an intoxicated Evelyn comes on to her, Betty responds by strangling her with a handkerchief and then drowning her. She is executed in June 1954, becoming the last woman executed in Ohio.

=== Season 11 (2017) ===
No. overall	No. in season	Title	Directed by	Written by	Original release date
146	1	"Mid-Life Murder"	Unknown	Unknown	September 1, 2017
In Cleveland, Ohio, Jeanne Harrington and her husband, Michael Gable, are in serious debt after his gambling addiction and her uncontrollable spending have left them broke. It all becomes too much for hoarder Jeanne, and on the night of August 16, 2011, she puts a vicious plan into action: stabbing and suffocating her husband to death. She is sentenced to sixteen years to life in prison. Mary Elizabeth Wilson is on her fourth husband, Ernest, after the mysterious deaths of two other husbands and a lover, but their marriage lasts less than a year, while Mary's suspicious comments during the initial wedding are raising eyebrows. The bodies of two of her previous husbands are exhumed, revealing high levels of phosphorus. Mary is found guilty of two murders and sentenced to death, with her motive revealed to be greed for money. She later becomes known as the Merry Widow of Windy Nook, and her death sentence is overturned, commuted to life in prison without parole instead. She dies on December 5, 1962, while incarcerated. In Granby, Missouri, Connie Sanders-Ford, 65, is deeply depressed after the death of her husband, but her new lover, 58-year-old John Jordan, seems to bring her out of her dark mental state. John is forced to admit his affair to his wife after Connie shows up on their doorstep. Connie's plan to get John to leave his wife of 30 years fails, as the couple decides to try and work it out, leaving Connie out in the cold and ultimately causing her to shoot John dead out of anger, before tearfully confessing to a friend. She is sentenced to life without parole in 2016, and ultimately dies in prison of natural causes in September 2024.
147	2	"Illicit and Lethal"	Unknown	Unknown	September 8, 2017
Cheryl Lucero, a single mother working as a waitress in Sonora, California, meets Rick Roberts, and they form a relationship despite Rick being married and Cheryl being in a long-term relationship, but guilt makes Rick end the fling, only for Cheryl to become obsessed. She starts stalking him and his wife Wendy, even building a shrine for him, but after learning for certain that Rick is no longer willing to tolerate her stalking, Cheryl snaps and kills Rick by shooting him, even keeping the bullet casing as a final souvenir. However, Rick has several friends in the police force and has already tried to report Cheryl for stalking, and thus she is quickly caught. She is found guilty of first-degree murder and sentenced to fifty years to life in prison. She will be eligible for parole in 2034. Eighteen-year-old Maria Barbella and her Italian family have moved from Italy to New York, where Maria looks for a husband, finding one in entrepreneur Domenico Cataldo, a fellow Italian immigrant. However, Domenico reveals to her that he is married, and later ends up drugging and raping her. Seeking to regain her virtue, Maria pleads with Domenico to marry her in a busy bar, but she ultimately kills Domenico after he refuses and insults her. Unable to fairly tell her side of the story, Maria is found guilty and sentenced to death, but is granted a retrial three years later, where her abuse at the hands of Domenico is finally told. She is acquitted of all charges and later goes on to marry a good man and have a family of her own. In Birmingham, England, Zatoon Bibi starts an affair with married man Tanveer Iqbal, even leaving her husband, Gul Nawaz, to be with Tanveer and entering into a polygamous relationship with him and his wife, Nazrine. Zatoon wants Nazrine out of the picture, though, and after a failed attempt to end their relationship ends up causing Tanveer to kick her out, Zatoon murders him in 2016 with the help of her ex-husband, and her fifteen-year-old son, Kashim Nawaz. Gul receives life and must serve twenty-five years, Kashim must serve at least six years, and the mastermind, Zatoon, receives the biggest sentence: life with a minimum of twenty-seven years.
148	3	"Broken Ties"	Unknown	Unknown	September 15, 2017
After a difficult childhood being raised by her verbally abusive aunt and uncle, Misook Nowlin of Bloomington, Illinois, has finally found love and care in both the arms of her Chinese-born husband, Don Wang, and his mother, Linda Tyda. Soon, however, the happy family is torn apart when Misook is caught shoplifting and Linda chooses not to bail her out of jail. Feeling betrayed, Misook plots revenge and ultimately strangles Linda in Misook's sewing shop. She is sentenced to fifty-five years in prison. She was also suspected in the murder of her ex-boyfriend's three-year-old daughter, Christina McNeil, in 1998, but was never charged. Styllou Christofi moves from Cyprus to Britain to be with her son Stavros, his wife, Hella, and three grandchildren, but things do not go well from the get-go, with Styllou being constantly judgmental of her 35-year-old daughter-in-law, and things come to a head on July 29, 1954, when Styllou ultimately bludgeons and strangles Hella to death and burns the house down to destroy the body, though she quickly gets help to save the children. Police find it hard to believe that a grandmother could commit such a brutal crime such as this until they look into her past. In 1925, back in Cyprus, a young Styllou was having problems with her own mother-in-law, and with the help of two accomplices, she killed her by shoving a burning torch down her throat, leading to her husband abandoning her out of fear. She is hanged for Hella's murder on December 13, 1954, becoming the penultimate woman executed in Britain before the death penalty was abolished. Sarah Vercauteren of Salem Township, Westmoreland County, Pennsylvania, a loving mother and a recovering heroin addict, lives with her divorced mother, Dawn Marie Wagner. Sarah relapses and starts using heroin again, and with no other option, her mother decides to kick her out after the holidays. On New Year's Eve, 2013, Sarah beats and strangles her mother to death and leaves her body in the bathroom. She is first charged with robbery after robbing a bank, but later, when Sarah's father discovers Dawn's body, a new charge of first-degree murder is added, and Sarah soon confesses. Despite showing remorse for what she did, she is sentenced to life without parole.
149	4	"The Dark Side"	Unknown	Unknown	September 22, 2017
Patricia Wells is working as a nurse in a retirement home when she meets William Jennings, and despite their age gap, they marry. However, after convincing her new husband to transfer half of his assets into her account, Patricia gains control of everything he owns and starts controlling and abusing William. When it starts to run out, however, she decides William is worth more dead than alive, and on September 19, 1989, she torturously kills William. She is found guilty and is sentenced to death, which is overturned in 2013 for life without parole. Megan Haines has a history of abusing elderly patients, but she still manages to get a job in an Australian nursing home. Her mistreatment of the elderly does not stop and three patients are constantly at the center of her abuse, Marie Darragh, 82, Isabella Spencer, 77, and another woman. The patients start complaining, so to keep them quiet, Megan fatally poisons Marie and Isabella with insulin in May 2014, though the third patient luckily escapes and reveals Megan's abuse, eventually getting her exposed for her crimes. Megan Haines is sentenced to 27 to 36 years in prison. Martha "Patty" Cannon is a tavern owner in 1820s Delaware, but she runs another secret business: kidnapping freed slaves before selling them again. Her tavern is popular amongst fellow slave traders. Patty does not care about human life and kills many people, including slaves and her own customers. She even burns a baby alive, suspecting it is the child of her cheating husband and a slave. She is finally arrested in 1829, but commits suicide in prison rather than face the hangman. She is known to have killed at least four people, but the count could be as high as 11 or more.
150	5	"Two To Tangle"	Unknown	Unknown	September 29, 2017
After Donna Roberts of Youngstown, Ohio, has a brush with death, she develops strange behavior and starts having an affair with Nathaniel "Nate" Jackson, a career criminal and a man nearly half her age, behind the back of her divorced-but-live-in ex-husband, Robert Fingerhut. They cook up a plan to murder Robert, which is successfully carried out just two weeks before Christmas. Nate proclaims Donna's innocence, but eventually, they both receive the death penalty. Donna becomes the only woman currently on death row in Ohio. In Jasper, Alabama, in 1997, Shonda Johnson is married five times by age twenty-eight, but is also a serial bigamist who is married to three men, one being Randy McCullar, and another being Tim Richards. When Randy learns about Shonda's secret life, Shonda is quickly arrested and charged with bigamy, and she manipulates Tim into killing Randy in a desperate attempt to keep her bigamy from being exposed. Richards gets a life sentence for pleading guilty and testifying against Shonda (despite being eligible for parole in 2013, it was revoked when he made an escape attempt thirteen months prior to his parole date). Meanwhile, Shonda gets the death penalty, but in 2014, it is commuted to life without parole. In Ottawa, Canada, Gurpreet Ronald and Bhupinderpal Gil are next-door neighbors who are having an illicit affair. Gurpreet wants Bhupinderpal all to herself, but he will not leave his wife, Jagtar, because of financial strain and losing custody of his children. Desperate, Gurpreet hatches a plan with Bhupinderpal to kill Jagtar, in which Gurpreet bludgeons and cuts her to death on January 29, 2014. Both Gurpreet and Bhupinderpal receive twenty-five-year sentences.
151	6	"Hit and Run"	Unknown	Unknown	October 6, 2017
Jacquelyn "Jackie" Greco is living the good life in Illinois with husband Carl Gaimari, but their marriage is on the rocks due to them having extramarital affairs and Jackie neglecting her children. One day in April 1979, two gunmen enter the home and murder Carl. It first seems like a robbery gone bad, but Jackie's family notices suspicious behavior with her hosting a party a few days later and marrying her lover. Jackie's sister comes forward with information about Carl's death, but it was not confirmed. Thirty-four years later, Jackie is finally arrested, and in 2016, she is found guilty and sentenced to thirty years in prison. This investigation is still ongoing, as her hitmen are still unidentified. PTSD-suffering veteran Bob and Martha Ann McClancy move from Florida to Tennessee, where the couple become friends with a fellow serviceman, Chuck Kaczmarczyk, and Martha eventually starts an affair with him. Martha later becomes overwhelmed with greed and plans to kill Bob with Chuck at her side; their first attempt fails, but their second attempt on May 15, 2006, is successful. Years after the death, the couple become con artists that include committing fraud by posing as elderly people with disabilities from the military. Martha Sue's son finds pictures with Bob posed in various positions after his death, exposing them as Bob's murderers. Chuck pleads guilty and is sentenced to twenty-five years, while Martha receives fifty years and is eligible for parole in 2028. Mike and Ellen Snyder both work in the automobile business and seem like a perfect couple, but Mike has multiple sclerosis and Ellen starts gambling, which causes Mike to divorce her. In January 2002, an argument ends with Ellen shooting Mike eight times. The murder goes unsolved for eight years until her son, who helped Ellen bury Mike's body, finally confesses in 2010. Ellen faces a first-degree murder charge, but she takes a plea bargain of manslaughter and is given a sentence of eleven years, much to the disgust of Mike's family. She is released in 2018 after serving eight years of her sentence.
152	7	"Death Watch"	Unknown	Unknown	October 13, 2017
Sarah Gonzales-McLinn is a Kansas teenager who looks like a good girl, but is actually a troubled soul who is a drug addict and a sexual abuse survivor, and does not change her ways even when her boss, Hal Sasko, lets her board at his house. Sarah starts fantasizing about killing people and reading books about serial killers, and on January 14, 2014, she kills Hal by drugging his beer with drugs, tying him up, and stabbing him through the neck. Convicted of first-degree murder, she is sentenced to fifty years, later commuted to twenty-five years in May 2021. In 1860s Pittsburgh, Martha Grinder is a housewife with a morbid fascination with death. Her obsession leads her to kill a maid, two brothers-in-law, her daughter and a neighbor couple, though her husband was the only one spared. Prosecuted for the murders of maid Jane Buchanan and neighbor Mary Caruthers, Martha is sentenced to death and hanged in November 1867. Samantha Bachynski meets her prince charming, Patrick Selepak, online while he is in prison. When he is released, he quickly returns to his life of crime, and involves his new lover. After robbing a store, the two torture and kill young couple Melissa and Scott Berels and their unborn baby before going on the run. Their plan to evade justice ultimately does not work and both are sentenced to life without parole.
153	8	"Hot Tempers, Cold Hearts"	Unknown	Unknown	October 20, 2017
After a tough divorce, Michigan mom Theresa Petto thinks she's found a new start in love when she sees high school friend Brent Kik, but Brent has no intentions of moving in with her even after she reveals she's pregnant. After her baby daughter's death, Theresa begins acting possessive of Brent and he ends the relationship, causing Theresa to stalk him and new girlfriend Rachel Drafta, and ultimately shoots and kills Rachel in June 2015. She pleads guilty to first-degree murder and receives life without parole. Showgirl Clara Phillips has a happy marriage with husband Armor, but when a neighbor tells Clara about Armor talking to a recently widowed woman named Alberta Meadows, it causes her to snap even though there is no evidence they are having an affair. On July 10, 1922, Clara and friend Peggy Caffee hitch a ride with Alberta to a secluded location, where Clara bashes Alberta with a hammer. She was sentenced to ten years to life and was released after twelve years. She is dubbed "Tiger Lady" because of how brutal the crime was. Yvonne Caylor moves from Texas to her home country of England after a back injury and moves in with her half-sister Nicki Collingbourne. Yvonne and Nicki's relationship sours when Yvonne becomes jealous of her, and after Yvonne steals a doll collection and tries to make Nicki's mother lie for her, Nicki kicks Yvonne out of the flat and has her arrested for burglary. On May 23, 2016, desperate to avoid jail time, Yvonne disguises herself as a man and later bludgeons Nicki with a chicken-shaped pot and strangles her. Yvonne is sentenced to life with 20 years minimum.
154	9	"The Love Of Money"	Unknown	Unknown	October 27, 2017
In Holland, Michigan, Maryann Castorena has fallen out of love with her long-time lover, Jose Hernandez, but not with his money, and wants his life insurance and to be with her secret married husband. On January 5, 2014, she hires gang teen Anthony Delagarza to beat Jose to death that evening. Anthony gets twenty to forty years, while Maryann gets life without parole. In early 20th century Delaware, May Carey is left destitute after her husband's death while raising her three sons. Robert, her brother and wealthy auto mechanic, is always there for May, but instead of being grateful, she envies him, and it only grows bigger when her mother dies and leaves her money and house to Robert. May forces her two oldest sons James and Howard in November 1927 to kill Robert and make the scene look like a robbery gone wrong. Seven years later, the killer family is exposed after the third son tells investigators about the murder. James gets life, while Howard and May are sentenced to death and are both hanged in 1935. In Muswellbrook, Australia, Michael and Michelle Willard at first have a happy marriage, but Michael's salary is decreased, and Michelle has a spending habit that puts them in debt. Michelle wants Michael's $250,000 life insurance to pay off the debts, and on February 21, 2003, Michelle hires neighbor Danielle Wilkinson and her teen lover to shoot Michael in his sleep. Danielle and her lover plead guilty and are given 16 to life sentences while Michelle gets 26 to life.
155	10	"Fatal Ties"	Unknown	Unknown	November 3, 2017
San Fernando Valley, California, couple Joel and Jennifer Shanbrom have a strained relationship due to Jennifer's expensive tastes that plunge them into debt, which gets worse when Jennifer has an affair with con artist Matthew Fletcher. After Joel discovers their affair, Jennifer and Matthew shoot him to death on March 18, 1998, to cash in his $1,000,000 life insurance. The police investigate the crime for years, tailing Jennifer and Matthew around the clock, until they finally crack the case and arrest them. Convicted of first-degree murder and insurance fraud, both are sentenced to life without parole. In 1770s Worcester, Massachusetts, Bathsheba Ruggles Spooner has a bad relationship with her abusive, alcoholic husband, Joshua. Her depressed mood changes when she meets teenage soldier Ezra Ross and nurses him back to health, with the liaison developing into an affair that results in Bathsheba getting pregnant. Fearing punishment due to the laws of the time, she has Ezra and two Red Coat soldiers beat Joshua to death and dump his body in a well on March 1, 1778. All four are sentenced to hang. Bathsheba requests a stay of execution at least until her baby is born, but it is denied, and she is hanged, while still pregnant, on July 2, 1778, becoming the first woman executed in the United States since the Declaration of Independence. In London, England, Maria Boyne is a selfish, shameless flirt who has multiple affairs with men, while her husband, Graham, is a devoted father to their children and wants to rekindle their relationship. On April 24, 2008, after Graham assaults Maria's new boyfriend, Gary McGinley, with whom Maria finds out she is having her third child, Maria lures him to have sex with her and stabs him thirty-one times. Her new life with Gary and their child on the way is short-lived when Graham's father shows up for a surprise visit (which only Graham knew about) and discovers the body. Maria tries to throw Gary under the bus out of desperation, but she is very quickly exposed, and she is sentenced to thirty-six years in prison and is eligible for parole in 2033.
156	11	"In The Family (2nd)"	Unknown	Unknown	November 10, 2017
Jennifer Pan goes from straight A student to an irresponsible disobedient as she constantly lies to her parents Huei Hann and Bich Ha, with whom she's always had a strained relationship. After her father discovers her lies, she is forbidden from seeing her boyfriend, Daniel Wong. Dreaming of eloping together and wanting her inheritance, Jennifer hires Daniel and three hitmen to kill her parents on November 8, 2010, but Huei Hann survives, and he gives away Jennifer to the police. Jennifer, Daniel, and the hitmen are given twenty-five-to-life sentences for Bich Ha's murder and Huei Hann's attempted murder. Martha Place at first had a good relationship with her stepdaughter Ida while she was a housekeeper, but as Ida's father William marries Martha, the bond disappears, and the family becomes volatile and violent as William shows more attention to Ida than Martha, which drives Martha insane with jealousy. On February 7, 1898, when Martha finds William's will stating Ida as the beneficiary, Martha snaps, throws acid on and asphyxiates Ida and later non-fatally attacks William with an axe. Martha is executed in March 1899, becoming the first woman executed in the electric chair. Judith Cengiz and Lindsay Jellett are Australian fraternal twins who share a trust fund of $130,000 due to Lindsay having been brain damaged from a car accident. Although Judith uses the money for Lindsay, she spends most of it in the poker machines, and her money transfer is cut off when the Supreme Court finds out about her activity. Eager for the money and to avoid her gambling addiction from being exposed, Judith drugs Lindsay and makes the crime scene look like a hit & run in May 1994. Because of no official cause of death, Judith is charged with attempted murder and is given ten years, but is released in 2002 after serving six.
157	12	"Tipping Point"	Unknown	Unknown	November 17, 2017
Amy Bishop was a professor and neurobiologist PhD in Chemistry at the University of Alabama in Huntsville, but has a narcissistic personality and a history of violent outbursts, including shooting her 18-year-old brother, Seth, to death in 1986. On February 12, 2010, after being denied tenure over poor performance, she opened fire during a meeting of the biology department, killing three of her colleagues and leaving three more critically wounded, then plans a date night with her husband while disposing of evidence. Facing a death sentence, she pleads guilty to three counts of capital murder and three counts of attempted murder and is sentenced to life in prison without parole. In New York in 1866, Irish woman Bridget Durgan was starting a new life as a maid, but her jobs did not last long. After having seizures, Dr. William Coriell examines her and ends up hiring her, much to the chagrin of his wife, Mary. Bridget is very good with the couple's young daughter, Mamey, but she envies Mary's lifestyle and husband, and she is lazy and insubordinate. After Mary convinces her husband to fire the maid, on February 25, 1867, Bridget stabs Mary to death before setting the house on fire to try and cover her tracks. Bridget is sentenced to death by hanging in 1867. In New Albany, Indiana, Lisa Shuler, a loving Christian, has secret sexual desires, and after separating from her husband, she begins browsing the Internet to looks for someone who can satisfy her desires, meeting forty-nine-year-old Charles Pierce. Lisa and Charles both indulge in their mutual desires and document it all on Charles' phone, but it quickly takes a toll on her, as she believes the relationship will destroy her Christian image. On May 6, 2013, she lures Charles into her house under the pretense of a rape fantasy and fatally shoots him multiple times but fails to delete the photographs and evidence on Charles' phone. After finally confessing to the murder, Lisa pleads guilty to first-degree murder and is sentenced to forty-five years in prison.
158	13	"Dumped and Dangerous"	Unknown	Unknown	November 24, 2017
In Worth County, Missouri, empty nesters Shannon O'Roark Griffin and her husband, Roscoe, are living apart, with Shannon refusing to move from their home in Missouri. When Shannon discovers that Roscoe had started a forbidden affair with his psychiatrist, Dr. Irina Puscariu, she becomes furious, and on January 13, 2012, she drives 250 miles throughout the night to Irina's house in Gladstone, Missouri, and shoots her dead in front of Irina's mother. Shannon pleads guilty to second-degree murder and armed criminal action and is sentenced to twenty years in prison for each crime, both to be served concurrently. Thirty-six-year-old Patricia Tito of Shreveport, Louisiana, has a way of luring in men and using them for money, but all of them, including her latest lover, Chris Shuffin, have discovered Patricia's ways and refuse to take her back. A penniless Patricia tries to get back with Chris, but he has moved on with fifty-nine-year-old secretary Judie Winn. On August 31, 2003, after weeks of threats, a jealous, angry Patricia shoots Judie through her kitchen window as she is washing the dishes, but Judie's dying words implicate Patricia, and Chris turns her in. Patricia pleads guilty to voluntary manslaughter and is sentenced to forty years in prison. In Sydney, Australia, thirty-year-old divorcee Manisha Patel starts dating security guard and fellow immigrant Niraj Dave, soon getting pregnant and agreeing to an abortion, but Niraj reveals to her he is betrothed to another. When his fiancée, Purvi Joshi, arrives in Sydney, Manisha is kicked out of her home, with Purvi taking her place, causing a furious Manisha to plan revenge. On July 30, 2013, she strangles Purvi while Niraj is at work using her own hands before stabbing her twice in the chest. Her attempt to stage the scene as a robbery fails, as Niraj knows she is guilty the moment he finds the body, and she is sentenced to twenty-four years in prison. On appeal, she is retried in March of 2018, found guilty of the lesser charge of manslaughter, and resentenced to eighteen years.

=== Season 12 (2018) ===
No. overall	No. in season	Title	Directed by	Written by	Original release date
159	1	"Married Today, Gone Tomorrow"	Unknown	Unknown	September 3, 2018
Young American Molly Martens takes a job in Ireland as a live-in nanny for single father of two Jason Corbett, becoming a mother figure for the two children. When Molly and Jason move back to the United States, however, their relationship deteriorates due to Molly's possessive nature over his kids after she had a miscarriage. Jason plans on returning to Ireland until Molly's parents make a surprise visit, and during that weekend visit in August 2015, Molly and her father Thomas, a former FBI agent, beat Jason to death in a failed attempt to take Jason's kids for themselves. Both father and daughter receive twenty-to-twenty-five-year prison sentences for murder, but in 2021, their convictions were quashed and they ultimately plead guilty to voluntary manslaughter and received a reduced sentence in 2023, ultimately being released in June 2024. In Houston, Texas, seemingly devout Jehovah's Witnesses Sandra Melgar and her husband, Jaime, appear to be a perfect couple, but their thirty-two-year marriage endures several problems. Sandra is devoted to her religion, but as a Jehovah's Witness, being divorced would result in her being shunned from her community. In December 2012, on the couple's wedding anniversary, Sandra stabs her husband to death in their bedroom and attempts to stage the scene as a burglary gone wrong. She is convicted of first-degree murder in 2017 and sentenced to twenty-seven years in prison. High school sweethearts Renee Poole and her husband, Brent, are young newlyweds with a baby daughter. Brent tries to provide for his family as a mechanic, but Renee becomes bored with marriage and motherhood, and the high school dropout becomes a stripper, having multiple sexual affairs at the strip club, including with a man named John Frazier, who taunts Brent about his relationship with Renee. On the couple's third anniversary in June 1998, Renee arranges for her and Brent to go on vacation in Myrtle Beach, South Carolina, under the guise of rekindling their marriage, but the weekend getaway is actually a setup for Renee and John to kill Brent. Both are convicted of Brent's murder, with Renee serving a life sentence without parole, while John is serving a thirty-year sentence.
160	2	"Kiss Then Kill"	Unknown	Unknown	September 14, 2018
Robin O'Neill becomes engaged to coworker Steve Lotts, but Robin has extreme jealousy with his female friends, and also goes as far as to stalk him. In November 2014, after Steve calls off the engagement, Robin shoots Steve and his twenty-eight-year-old son, Jamis, killing them both. Showing great remorse over Jamis's murder (as he had always been kind to her), but none for Steve's, she is convicted of aggravated murder and is sentenced to life without parole. Sarah Williams and Katrina "Kit" Walsh are best friends despite their twenty-year age difference, and enjoy using men for money, with Sarah having sex with them. Sarah's new lover is fifty-seven-year-old Ian Johnston, but he breaks off the fling to be with his partner Sadie Hartley. After numerous attempts to get Ian back fail, both women plan her murder for a year before acting on it in January 2016. Kit gets twenty-five to life, and Sarah thirty to life. The marriage of Ronrico and Ashley Shutes falls apart due to Ashley's temper and violent outbursts, including attacking her ex-lover with her car in 2005. After a year of marriage, the couple decide to separate, but argue about their custody agreement of their infant daughter. In May 2016, Ashley ends an argument with her ramming Ronrico twice with their car, and tries to claim it was an accident despite a witness. Ronrico refuses to press charges, but after he succumbs to his injuries, Ronrico's mother exposes Ashley's crime, and Ashley is arrested and sentenced to fifteen to life.
161	3	"Friends Are Foes"	Unknown	Unknown	September 21, 2018
Jennifer Rose Trent is a Florida woman struggling to make ends meet for her son. She befriends sixty-nine-year-old Doris Johnston, who allows Jennifer and her son to stay with her in her home rent-free. When Doris goes out of state to visit her family, Jennifer moves in her boyfriend and spends $15,000 of Doris's money, mostly on herself. In January 2015, Doris confronts Jennifer after being alerted to the missing money, causing Jennifer to seriously injure her, and eventually kill her after four days of waiting for Doris to die. Jennifer is sentenced to life without parole. Jemma Lilley is an Australian woman who practices S&M and has a disturbing obsession with serial killers, particularly Son of Sam, sharing these dark interests with her submissive new friend and housemate, Trudi Lenon. In June 2016, they make their murder fantasies come true by tricking Trudi's son's eighteen-year-old friend, Aaron Pajich, into coming to their home to swap video games with her son, stabbing him in the neck and chest before burying his body in the backyard. Both are sentenced to life with a minimum of twenty-eight years. Jacqueline Luongo meets Patricia Viveiros at an A.A. meeting, and they move in together, but Jacqueline eventually starts stealing her money and life insurance checks. After being confronted with the fraud, Jacqueline has Patricia arrested for a DUI warrant, and in August 2014, Jacqueline violently suffocates Patricia to death before going on another spending spree. Jacqueline confides in the murder to her lover, Maria Caldoron, who turns her in. While awaiting trial, she attempts to have Maria murdered, but this is caught by police in a sting. Convicted of murder and attempted murder, Jacqueline is sentenced to life without parole.
162	4	"Lover Makes Three"	Unknown	Unknown	September 28, 2018
Giovanni and Crystal Gambino appear to be a perfect couple, but both indulge in drugs and sex parties which plunges them into debt and causes their wine importing business to fail. Despite this, the couple find comfort in their orgies to fix their marriage. In February 2016, the couple invite another couple, Geoffrey Gilliland and Stephanie Sanchez, to their house for a foursome. When Crystal tries to join in, Giovanni pushes her away, causing Crystal to go berserk and shoot all three. She pleads guilty to manslaughter and two counts of second-degree murder and receives 29 years in prison. After her husband abandons her, Ada Hulmes is in dire straits for her daughter who she leaves in a convent. Her income becomes her talents in piano and charm, and she travels around the southwest performing in saloons before settling down in Silver City, New Mexico. There, she befriends prostitute Claude Lewis and finds love in Jack Brown, a married womanizer. In February 1889, Jack dumps Ada for Claude, and Ada later goes to the saloon, shooting him in front of many witnesses. She receives only three years. Sabah Khan is a British Pakistani woman who lives with her entire family, including her sister Saima and her husband Jafez Raymond and their children. Later, Sabah and Jafez begin an illicit affair behind everyone's back, which goes on for several years, and leads to Sabah having an abortion and desiring to be a mother figure to her nieces and nephews. In May 2016, when the couple announce they will move out of the house and Jafez ends the relationship, an enraged Sabah stabs Saima nearly 68 times and attempts to make the scene look like a robbery gone wrong. She pleads guilty to murder and receives 22 years to life.
163	5	"Twisted Desires"	Unknown	Unknown	October 5, 2018
In the 1970s, Rita Gluzman became an activist in order to successfully free her husband Yakov from the Soviet Union, and Yakov becomes a celebrated microbiologist. But after two decades of living in the United States, their marriage deteriorates due to Rita's spending, and Yakov seeks to divorce Rita. On April 6th, 1996, Rita and her cousin Vladimir Zelenin hack him to death with an axe before dismembering his body. Vladimir pleads guilty and is given 22 and a half years; he is released in 2015. Rita is convicted on a federal charge of interstate domestic violence resulting in death and receives life without parole. After 22 years in prison, she is granted a compassionate release in 2020 due to her suffering from health issues. Separated 20-something-year-old parents Rex and Amanda Taylor are obsessed with serial killers. After Rex spirals into a deep depression and commits suicide, Amanda blames Rex's father for the tragedy, and with her new partner named Sean Ball at her side, they kill Rex's father in April 2015, with Amanda taking a selfie with his corpse and posting it online. Amanda quickly attempts to kill Sean and also posts her crime online, but Sean survives. Amanda is sentenced to life without parole, while Sean is sentenced to 60 years. Kayleigh Woods, a transgender woman, and her new boyfriend, Jack Williams are obsessed with Satanism. Their toxic relationship is witnessed by their housemate Bethany Hill, Jack's ex-girlfriend. After having Jack removed from their apartment by police, he is soon back with Kayleigh once again and living in the apartment. On February 2nd, 2016, Bethany calls her father to seek help moving from the apartment, but that same night, Kayleigh and Jack attack Bethany, binding her and placing her in a bathtub before torturing her and severing her jugular vein. After cleaning up the crime scene, Kayleigh calls the police and claims Bethany had died by suicide, but her claim soon fails, and both killers are caught and receive 26 years to life.
164	6	"The Blame Game"	Unknown	Unknown	October 19, 2018
In Kannapolis, North Carolina, Marlene Johnson's marriage to husband Ervin becomes troubled due to Marlene's jealousy and volatile behavior against him and coworker Shirley Pierce. After their separation, Marlene continues to harass and stalk both of them, mindlessly and groundlessly believing that Shirley has stolen Ervin from her. On July 23, 2013, Marlene violently slashes Shirley to death. Due to her past violent actions against Shirley being well known, she is caught almost immediately, and in 2018, she is sentenced to life without parole. From a young age, Estibaliz "Esti" Carranza has dreams of motherhood, but feels husband Holger Holz cannot give her a baby due to his Hare Krishna faith. In April 2008, Holger goes missing and Esti falls in love with Manfred Hinterberger, with whom she once had an affair during her marriage. In 2010, he, too, goes missing. Later, in 2011, it is revealed that Esti killed both men and hid their remains in the basement of her ice cream parlor in Vienna, Austria. During her trial, Esti gives birth to a son she had with a man she dated after killing Manfred, but her dreams are forever shattered when, due to her crimes, her son is permanently taken out of her hands to be raised by her parents instead, leaving Esti to plead guilty to the two murders and be sentenced to life in a maximum security psychiatric prison. Jody Herring is a troubled Vermont woman with an addiction to drugs and alcohol that causes her to lose custody of her three children. Family and friends are there for her, but are shown concern about her behavior, which further leads to a breakup with a lover and an attempted suicide. In August 2015, Jody steals a hunting rifle and goes on a killing spree, murdering her aunt, Julie Falzarano, her cousins, Regina and Rhonda Herring, and social worker Lara Sobel. Unrepentant and remorseless, she pleads guilty to one count of first-degree murder and three counts of second-degree murder and is permanently separated from her children when she is sentenced to life without parole.
165	7	"Love Turns to Hate"	Unknown	Unknown	November 2, 2018
Tausha Fields Morton is a serial bride who enjoys attention for men and cheating on past husbands. One of them, named Mitch Kemp, with whom she has a daughter, Lexie, is no exception, as she cheats on him with Greg Morton, and later marries him while still married to Mitch, thus committing bigamy. On August 24, 2004, when Mitch fights for custody of their daughter, Tausha, fearing her secrets will be exposed, convinces Greg with a lie to murder Mitch, and the two of them kill Mitch and bury his body in a rural property. Not long after, Tausha dumps Greg for another man, causing Greg to realize he had been lied to by Tausha. Eventually, the crime is exposed and the killers are caught, with a remorseful Greg pleading guilty and receiving nineteen years, while Tausha receives a life sentence without parole. Ellishia Allen is a British glamour model with a drinking problem and a volatile temper. She is able to find love in Karl Bloxham, who tries to help her sober up, but her drinking problem comes back after months of sobriety. In June 2015, after a few years into the relationship, Karl wants out, but a rage-filled Ellishia stabs him fatally in the cardiac area. She pleads guilty to murder and is sentenced to a 14 year minimum sentence with eligibility for parole at age forty-three. Raminder Kaur and Baldeo Taneja are Indian-born natives in their 60s living in America, who fall in love with each other, but Baldeo has his wife, Preeta Gabba, back in Mumbai, who later moves to the United States, where she discovers their affair, causing a divorce. Preeta intends to stay in America and demands Baldeo to pay alimony, which he does not intend, resulting in Preeta developing a huge hatred between herself and Baldeo and intense jealousy of Raminder. On October 12, 2013, Raminder shoots Preeta several times in the back in front of many witnesses. Both Raminder and Baldeo are convicted of murder and receive life imprisonment. Raminder will be eligible for parole in 2032.
166	8	"Jilted and Jealous"	Unknown	Unknown	November 9, 2018
In 1950's Salt Lake City, Utah, Jean Sinclair, the owner of a retirement home, begins a forbidden love with her beautician, LaRae Peterson. But Jean becomes possessive of her, and after six years, LaRae ends their relationship and gets a fresh start with Donald Foster, who becomes her fiancé. In January 1963, Jean ambushes Donald, shooting him near the face, and blindly believes that her murderous deed will win LaRae back, but instead, LaRae turns Jean in. Jean is sentenced to life without parole and dies in prison. In 1861, Paula Angel meets the love of her life in Juan Miguel Martin, a married man who hangs out in saloons and with prostitutes. After finding out his secrets and refusing to marry her, Paula stabs him three times. She was unable to tell her side of the story to a jury and was sentenced to hang, spending her last days being mentally and verbally tortured by the cruel sheriff who had her in his custody. Despite two children and financial security, Paul and Rena Salmon have a loveless marriage due to Rena's severe depression and drug abuse which leads to them separating. They both talk about their troubles with neighbor, Lorna Stewart, a married woman, who then has an intimate relationship with Paul, which results in her leaving her husband. In September 2002, a jealous Rena shoots a pregnant Lorna several times. She was sentenced to fourteen years to life and was released in 2016.
167	9	"Boiling Point"	Unknown	Unknown	November 16, 2018
Victoria Rickman is a volatile hot-tempered woman who has a history of abuse and violent outbursts, and her new lover William "Will" Carter is no exception, also resenting his time he spends with his daughter from a previous relationship. After violent assaults, Will gets out of the relationship, but Victoria will not let him go, going so far as to accuse him of rape and abuse. After her lies are exposed, she assaults Will again, which earns her a battery charge against her. On September 13, 2013, after having sex, Victoria shoots Will several times and claims self-defense, but due to her previous lies about her being raped being very well known, her claim is destroyed, and in 2017, she is sentenced to life without parole. In the late 19th century London, Mary Wheeler is a young woman who enjoys using men for money and sex (one in particular was Frank Hogg). She later begins an affair with Mary's close friend Phoebe, then gets hitched when she gets pregnant. In October 1890, she beats Phoebe to death with a fire poker and slashes her throat, then uses her body to smother the infant, and dumps their bodies. She is hanged on December 23, 1890. Dan and Lauren Stuart are a Michigan couple who are devout to their Jehovah's Witnesses faith, but turn on their faith when they decide their two children should go to college, a decision which gets them shunned from the church. After five years of excommunication, Lauren suffers from depression, which makes her believe too much about Armageddon. In February 2018, she murders Dan, her children (Steven and Bethany), and the family dog, before ultimately committing suicide.
168	10	"The Takers"	Unknown	Unknown	November 23, 2018
Kirsten Stephens is an Independence, Missouri, woman who is married to her retired coworker, Charlie, but has a severe compulsive gambling problem that forces Charlie to come out of retirement after she loses nearly a million dollars over the course of their marriage. In March 2014, Kirsten shoots Charlie in the back with a rifle as he sleeps to collect on his life insurance and makes the scene look like a robbery gone wrong. Though she is offered a deal to avoid a life sentence with a guilty plea, she unwisely makes one final gamble and takes her chances with a jury. She is ultimately convicted of first-degree murder and sentenced to life without parole. Brittney Dwyer is an Australian woman who has a close relationship with her grandfather, Robert Whitwell, but in secret, Brittney has a dark obsession with murder and violence. While visiting Robert, her mother tells her about hidden money in his shed, and in August 2016, Brittney and new friend Bernadette Burns drive 1,200 miles to her grandfather's house where Brittney fatally stabs him in the neck and chest. For cooperating with the investigation, Bernadette receives a minimum of 13 years and six months. As the mastermind, Brittney gets a minimum of twenty-one years. Joe and Iryn Meyers are a couple who own a garage with their trusted employee David O'Dell. But after Iryn decides she wants her children from a previous relationship to come to the US, they both use David by purchasing his house and taking out a life insurance policy on him, with Iryn going so far as to neglect to give his medication for seizures. On Valentine's Day, 2016, Joe and Iryn attack David and burn down his house with him still inside. Convicted of murder, arson, fraud, and falsifying documents, they are sentenced to twenty-three years to life.

=== Season 13 (2019) ===
No. overall	No. in season	Title	Directed by	Written by	Original release date
169	1	"Fatal Love"	Unknown	Unknown	August 22, 2019
Lucille Miller was an ambitious housewife with dreams of climbing the social status unlike her husband Cork. She begins an affair with lawyer Arthwell Hayton in the belief that she will climb the social ladder, but Arthwell dumps her. In October 1964, Lucille drugs Cork and burns him alive in the car for his insurance money. She was sentenced to life in prison but was released after serving only seven years of her sentence and died at the age of 56. She is also suspected of killing Elaine Hayton, Arthwell's wife. Jackie Spaulding gets a motel thanks to her husband Roger, but after eight years of running the business, the motel falls apart due to her owing money and the motel being occupied by prostitutes and felons, and shortly after that, she begins an affair. Roger, knowing divorce is not an option because he will carry all her debts, decides to separate and leave town. Jackie plots to kill him, and ultimately does so in June 2004 with the help of two hitmen. Jackie was sentenced to life without parole plus an additional five years for conspiracy to commit murder. The hitmen are never found. Englishwoman Julie Dixon and her boyfriend David Twigg run a craft shop, but Julie neglects paying the bills and does not tell David, and is soon risked with bankruptcy. By March 2011, with a warrant for David's arrest for a failed summons appearance, Julie panics and decides to lock David in the shed and burn him alive with petrol and gets away with it for three months, before she is ultimately caught and sentenced to life with a minimum of twenty-three years.
170	2	"Beauty and the Beastly"	Unknown	Unknown	August 29, 2019
Amanda Perry Hayes and her husband, Grant, are locked in a bitter custody battle for Grant's two sons with his ex-wife, Laura Ackerson. In July 2011, after knowing that the chance of getting full custody is slim, the couple murder and dismember Laura at their home and drive from North Carolina to Texas in order to dump her body. Grant receives life without parole, while Amanda receives thirteen to sixteen years, plus an additional twenty years. Selfish country girl Beulah Annan begins an affair with laundromat manager Harry Kalstedt for financial gain and promiscuous fun. In April 1924, after an argument that results in Harry ending the relationship, Beulah shoots Harry and successfully claims self-defense, causing a sympathetic jury to acquit her of all charges, denying Harry justice. It is nature that doles out its own form of justice, however, when Beulah dies a few years later. Roxie Hart of the musical Chicago is based on Beulah. Irish baptist Colin Howell and Hazel Stewart begin a year-long affair behind their spouses' back. In May 1991, the two fatally gas Colin's wife Lesley and Hazel's husband Trevor Buchanan, and stage their deaths as a double suicide. They get away with it for eighteen years until Colin confesses. Colin gets life with a minimum of twenty-one years, and Hazel gets life with a minimum of eighteen years.
171	3	"A Family Tragedy"	Unknown	Unknown	September 2, 2019
In San Juan, Puerto Rico, Áurea Vázquez-Rijos marries Canadian billionaire Adam Anhang for his money by faking a pregnancy, but after a week, Adam discovers her lie and seeks a divorce. Aurea harasses him, and, on September 22, 2005, Aurea, her sister, and boyfriend hire a hitman, Alex Pablon Colon, to kill Adam and stage it as a robbery gone wrong. Aurea flees to Europe, but after thirteen years, she is captured, extradited, and sentenced to life without parole. Pamela Lee Worms moves from Wales to New Orleans, Louisiana, after her husband banishes her for infidelity. There, she marries Moses Worms, and they move. However, Pamela soon turns into a serial killer by killing her stepson to bring back her husband, then a female relative, her stepdaughter, and, finally, Moses himself, all in her path to keep her infidelity secrets and to gain Moses's inheritance. Her attempt to gain the inheritance fails, as before his death, Moses disinherited her from his will. She is soon exposed for her murder of Moses thanks to a friend in whom Moses confided, convicted for it, and is sentenced to hang in 1851. In Perth, Australia, Helen Levina becomes financially dependent on her mother, Ella Hromaya, who she deeply despises and resents. Ella, fearful and tired of the constant arguing, announces that she will move out, but on February 22, 2016, Helen snaps, stabs and bludgeons Ella to death, buries her in the backyard, and steals her money. The crime is exposed when Helen's daughter finds Ella's body, and security cameras catch Helen withdrawing money from Ella's bank accounts. She is sentenced to life with a minimum of twenty years.
172	4	"Vow to Kill"	Unknown	Unknown	September 5, 2019
Jane Carpenter and her husband Brent move from California to Arizona so Jane can care for her grandmother, but the stress of playing nurse causes Jane to have animosity toward her grandmother and later Brent, who is diabetic, and to make matters worse, their design business begins to fail, leaving them broke. In June 2002, Jane snaps and violently kills Brent and stages the murder as robbery and gets away with it for a decade, but is eventually caught and is sentenced to 25 years to life. Emma LeDoux gets hitched for the fourth time with a rich man named Jean LeDoux, but she is still married with her third husband Albert McVicar. In March 1906, Emma poisons Albert with morphine, bludgeons him, and puts him in a trunk. She was sentenced to life and paroled after 10 years, but ends up back in prison for a dating scam, and dies in prison in 1941. She is suspected of killing her second husband. Lindy Williams meets the man of her dreams in George Gerbic, who shares her love in politics. But on September 5, 2013, Lindy kills George and dismembers his body and burns his torso, and then claims George is out of the country and spends his money. She is eventually caught for her crime and is sentenced to life with a minimum of 20 years. The rest of George's body is never found.
173	5	"Without Mercy"	Unknown	Unknown	September 12, 2019
Paige Conley is a drug addict and alcoholic who lives with her loving mother Carlene, whom she regularly bullies and gets in trouble. In March 2015, Paige brutally murders Carlene after an argument over food and claims trick or treaters murdered Carlene, despite Halloween being seven months away. That inconsistency soon proves to be her undoing, and she is sentenced to 20 to 27 years in prison. In 2019, her sentence was vacated and she faced a retrial; Paige ultimately accepted a plea deal in August 2019 for 20 years. Becky Reid is a volatile, violent, hot-tempered woman who has a history of beating up and abusing ex-girlfriends, and her latest lover, single mom Lyndsey Vaux, is no exception. For years, Becky beats, humiliates, and starves Lyndsey with the help of her mother. In May 2016, Lyndsey dies from the abuse, and Becky is sentenced to life with a minimum of 20 years for Lyndsey's death and beating a former girlfriend. Katie Coursey finds love in paraplegic aspiring rapper Troy Johnson and seems like a devoted girlfriend, but in truth, she is a jealous, possessive woman with a history of secret drug abuse. In March 2017, Katie tries to make Troy try drugs while they are running an errand, but he refuses and calls the police. Katie, high and angered at Troy calling the police on her, abandons Troy in a forest, leaving him to die of hypothermia. She pleads guilty to murder and neglect and is sentenced to life without parole.
174	6	"Kill the Competition"	Unknown	Unknown	September 19, 2019
Mary Jane Fonder becomes obsessed with her church's new pastor, but he rebuffs her advances. When he shows attention and compassion to new member Rhonda Smith, Mary becomes consumed with jealousy and shoots Rhonda to death in January 2008. She is sentenced to life without parole and dies in prison in 2018. Mary Jane Fonder was also a suspect in the disappearance of her father in August 1993. In 1920's Chicago, Wanda Stopa's aspiration to be the first female prosecutor is destroyed, and she turns to the bohemian lifestyle and finds love with a married advertising executive. In April 1924, Wanda goes to his home with the intention of murdering his wife and keeping the executive all to herself, but winds up shooting the couple's elderly housekeeper Henry Manning instead when he tries to intervene, while the wife manages to escape. On the run from the law, plastered all over the news, and unable to live with the failure of her plan and her losing the executive forever, Wanda discloses her location to authorities before taking her own life in defeat. Fashion designer Sabrina Kouider's frequent paranoid delusions leave her convinced that her newly hired au pair, Sophie Lionnet, is a spy hired by her ex-boyfriend to steal from her and harm her children. In September 2017, after subjecting Sophie to weeks of abuse, Sabrina and her partner, Ouissem Medouni, torture a false confession from Sophie before drowning her and burning her body. Both are sentenced to life in prison with a minimum of 30 years.
175	7	"Fatal Fixation"	Unknown	Unknown	September 26, 2019
Party girl Liz Golyar becomes infatuated with single dad Dave Kroupa, but he is in a relationship with another woman, Cari Farver. After Dave no longer wants Liz, she stalks Cari and carries out a premeditated plan to create a fake profile to befriend Cari and gain her trust, ultimately kidnapping and killing Cari in November 2012, then impersonates Cari on cyberspace for the next four years while making herself a victim. She is sentenced to life in prison for murder plus an additional 18 to 20 years for arson. Cari's body is never recovered. In 1905, Marie Arthur, a preacher's daughter, is rebellious and already married when she falls in love with a bartender, Frank Broadway Jones, but all is not happiness in her life, as they are broke financially and she proves herself to be not happy with Frank. Desiring a social life with alcohol, Maria has affairs with miners and prostitutes for her own desires, until news spreads town that Frank has had an affair with a woman. Despite attempting to reconcile, Marie becomes angry when Frank has a casual encounter with another woman, and the hope for reconciliation was dissolved. In January 1914, she shoots Frank twice, one in the leg and the second in the back. But after realizing what she's done, she attempts to shoot herself in the stomach, but survives. She pleads guilty to involuntary manslaughter and is sentenced to a year in prison. She is paroled after four months. In 1993, Lucy Cruz and Gloria Rivera are madly in love, but the relationship falls apart when Gloria spends nights out late and Lucy suspects Gloria is cheating on her, ultimately ending the relationship because Lucy cannot get her pregnant. After many failed attempts to get Gloria back, Lucy wants revenge, and in September 1993, Lucy shoots Gloria. Lucy pretends to have no memory of the incident, but her story quickly falls apart, and in 1994, she is sentenced to 35 years in prison. Lucy is paroled in 2017 after serving 23 years.
176	8	"Ditched and Desperate"	Unknown	Unknown	October 10, 2019
In Loxahatchee, Florida, Melanie Eam and James Barry, Jr., share a passion for video games, which makes them fall in love at a gaming competition. While Melanie is sweet on the outside, however, she is a jealous, possessive woman on the inside, believing that James is spending more time with his best friend, Jeff Jarzibokowski, than he is with her, and in retaliation, she kills all of James's expensive fish. On November 17, 2016, James breaks up with Melanie for good via gaming chat, and in a bitter rage, she visits his home and stabs him to death. Charged with second-degree murder, Melanie is sentenced to fifty years. She will be eligible for release on February 24, 2066, when she will be seventy. In 1910s Salt Lake City, Utah, hotel housekeeper Amy Hill has an affair with owner Ross Bonny, with Amy ditching her family to be with him. The two get engaged, but Ross wants to spend more time at work than with his fiancée. Suspicious, she decides to follow him and finds out that he is a womanizer and preys on divorcees. When she and Ross's sister, Winnie, confront him about this, Ross gets angry, and on November 9, 1916, Amy shoots him twice with a revolver but her conscience quickly gets the better of her. She is sentenced to nine months in prison, but only serves two due to sympathetic circumstances. In Kingsland, Texas, school volunteer Kathryn "Kathy" Louise Preston starts a relationship with twenty-year-old Joe Hernandez. While Joe is madly in love with her, Kathy is a predator and only loves men for their assets: getting her pregnant so that she can obtain child support from them. Fed up with her demands, Joe ends the relationship, and on August 26, 2014, Kathy beats Joe to death, smothers him, and sets his body ablaze. She is caught immediately and is sentenced to forty-five years. She will be available for parole in 2039.
177	9	"Blood Money"	Unknown	Unknown	October 17, 2019
After a short stay in prison for a minor offense, Esther Beckley hooks up with Shane Harrison. In March 1996, Esther and Shane decide to rob a video store where they kill three employees and the grandparents of one of the employees. Shane is sentenced to 258 years in prison. Esther pleads guilty and sentenced to 95 1/2 years in prison. She is eligible for parole when she is 120 years old, meaning she will most likely die in prison. English Rose Sharon Swinhoe is a magnet for many men and attracts 66-year-old retiree Peter McMillian, but Sharon is only in that relationship for his money. She lies about Peter raping her, and then, in October 2012, gets smitten friend Joseph Collins to help beat him to death so she can spend all his money. Joseph gets 20 years and Sharon gets life with a minimum of 25 years. Swinhoe died in prison from COVID in March 2021. Former drug addict Virginia Caudill was about to get married and had a great relationship with her future mother-in-law Lonetta White until she became an addict again. Her fiancé breaks off the engagement and warns Lonetta to not let Virginia in her home. In March 1998, Virginia, and an accomplice, Johnathon Goforth, break into Lonetta's home to steal items to pawn for drug money and kill her in the process, going on the run for the next eight months. Both are ultimately caught and are sentenced to death.
178	10	"Loveless"	Unknown	Unknown	October 24, 2019
In Bremerton, Washington, Shelly Arndt and Darcy Veeder, Jr., seem like a perfect couple on the outside, but in reality, she's a controlling alcoholic, and after the constant abuse, Darcy writes a letter to Shelly which leads to their breakup. But Shelly is determined to have the final move, and on February 23, 2014, Shelly invites Darcy to drink at the house of her twin sister, Kelly Arndt O'Neil, to reconcile, but Darcy does not want to get back with her. In retaliation, she takes a bean bag and lights it on fire, burning the house down and killing both him and Kelly's St. Bernard, Chevy, who dies trying to rescue him. Convicted of aggravated first-degree murder, arson, and six counts of second-degree assault, Shelly is sentenced to life without parole. Party girl Jacqueline Crymble is a self-centred narcissist who attracts Roger Ferguson, but when her husband Paul finds out about the affair, she manipulates Roger into murdering him, and on Father's Day, 2004, they beat and suffocate him to death to collect on his $450,000 life insurance policy. They stage a burglary to cover up the murder, but the police are not fooled at this, and the murderers are exposed and convicted in 2007, with Roger sentenced to eighteen years to life, and Jacqueline getting twenty years to life. In Albuquerque, New Mexico, Lisa Segotta and her husband, Andy, have a troubled marriage, as Lisa is abusive and isolates him from his family, all while starting an affair with David Mead. Desperate for money, Lisa and David decide to murder Andy for his life insurance policy, and in March 1981, David stabs Andy forty-four times with a bowie knife. But in the process, David accidentally stabs himself, which ruins the plan and ends up exposing their murderous crime and motive. David is sentenced to twelve years, and Lisa is sentenced to sixteen years, and with good behavior, she only serves eight years, exactly half of her sentence. However, Lisa does not get to enjoy her freedom for long, as she dies of unknown causes two years after her release.

=== Season 14 (2021) ===
No. overall	No. in season	Title	Directed by	Written by	Original release date
179	1	"Tainted Love"	Unknown	Unknown	June 17, 2021
Ciera Harp meets aspiring rap star Rahim Grant and is immediately smitten by him. But while Rahim sees their relationship as pure friendship, Ciera wants it to be more than that, going as far as to drugging and raping him, leading to her getting pregnant. In December 2017, an argument between the two ends lethally when Ciera shoots Rahim several times, with the murder recorded on Rahim's phone. She is sentenced to life for 125 years. Linda Ricchio dates her coworker, Ron Ruse, but their relationship is strained due to her possessive nature. After their breakup, Linda goes on a months-long campaign of harassment and stalking when he meets his new girlfriend. In December 1987, Linda shoots Ron outside his apartment. She is sentenced to twenty-seven years to life, and her parole applications have been denied. Loretta Burroughs rekindles her relationship with her high school sweetheart Danny and later marries him, but is also a compulsive gambler. When Danny decides to move to Florida to live with his estranged children, Loretta becomes angry, and in August 2007, she brutally stabs Danny to death and hides the body in her closet for the next six years. Found guilty of murder, she is sentenced to fifty-five years in prison.
180	2	"Evil Spirits"	Unknown	Unknown	June 24, 2021
Army Veteran Barbara Rogers becomes devout to an online cult in order to fall in love with Steven Mineo, but Steven's devoutness to the cult and the leader annoys Barbara and a social media post make her and Steven a target of online harassment from the members. Steven turns his back on them, but in July 2017, a depressed Steven regrets his decision, and an outraged Barbara, who has bipolar disorder, drugs Steven and shoots him. She gets a 15-40 year sentence. Italian fortuneteller Leonarda Cianciulli had a life of tragedy which makes her emotionally attached to her children. When her son Giuseppe is drafted to fight during WWII, a distraught Leonarda draws a strange conclusion that in order to protect her son, she has to commit a human sacrifice. Between 1939 and 1940, Leonarda drugs three neighbors, chops their bodies, and makes soap and tea cakes out of them. She gets 30 years in prison plus three years in an asylum, dying in 1970. In mid-1980s Baltimore, Geraldine Parrish is a self-described voodoo priestess and preacher who draws people to make her the beneficiary of their life insurance, but she has psychopathic tendencies, likes to show off her wealth, and is a greedy person. This turns her into a serial killer, and she has accomplice Edwin Gordon kill some of her family and friends, including a brother-in-law, one of her husbands, and a niece who survives multiple attempts on her life. Convicted of five murders and three attempted murders, Geraldine and Edwin receive life without parole, and Geraldine dies behind bars in 2004.
181	3	"Flash Point"	Unknown	Unknown	July 1, 2021
Despite her husband James's generous personality, Rhonda Orr expects more out of James and his family, soon having an affair with another man and getting pregnant. Due to the financial straits, the young couple soon separate and head for a divorce but live together in their marital home. In May 2003, Rhonda sets fire to the house, leaving James to die of smoke inhalation to collect on his insurance policies and hide her affair. She receives eighty-eight years in prison, but she could be eligible for parole as early as 2023. Florence Ransom always had dreams of being high in the social status, but they become delusions as she uses her family as servants, especially around her lover Lawrence Fisher, who she wants to marry. But Lawrence is still married to his wife Dorothy, who he is separated from. In July 1940, a jealous and fed-up Florence shoots Dorothy, their daughter Freda, and the family maid Charlotte Saunders. Originally sentenced to death, Florence is committed to a psychiatric prison. Patricia Hill is a nurse and Sunday school teacher who is seen as a loving god-fearing woman. But her husband Frank is a heavy drinker and is addicted to porn, much to her frustration. In July 2018, after finding a porn channel on their cable bill, Patricia snaps and shoots Frank twice with a .22-caliber pistol. Shattered and remorseful, Patricia pleads guilty to five offenses, receiving a sixteen-year sentence, and is currently eligible for parole.
182	4	"Kill Their Creators"	Unknown	Unknown	July 8, 2021
Heather Barbara is a troubled woman with a hot temper fueled by drugs; her temper cost her husband and children. Her relationship with her mother, Michelle Gordon, is contentious, which worsens after her brother dies of a drug overdose. In July 2018, an argument between mother and daughter ends with Heather beating Michelle and her grandmother Elaine Rosen with her father's police baton, then she steals their money and jewelry. She pleads guilty to murder and manslaughter and receives 42 years in prison. Simona Zafirovska is a college student who has a close relationship with her mother, Radica, a Macedonian immigrant, but their relationship is strained due to Simona desiring a man in Macedonia who is in his late 30's and neglecting her studies. In October 2016, after Radica tells Simona to focus on her studies, Simona beats her mother with a wooden plank, then claims intruders broke in the house. Her claim fails, and she is sentenced to life in prison with a twenty-year minimum. Dayna Jennings has a relationship with husband #4, Chris, which is strained due to his infidelity and financial straits. Her father Bill is there to help her, but Dayna blames her problems on him. In December 2017, a frustrated Dayna poisons Bill with horse tranquilizers and buries his body in the basement by using cement to hide the evidence. Her attempts to get away with her actions ultimately fail, and she is sentenced to life without parole.
183	5	"To Have And To Harm"	Unknown	Unknown	July 15, 2021
Roslyn Pilmar's charmed life in New York's Upper East Side with her millionaire entrepreneur husband Howard and their son threatens to come to a halt when she's caught embezzling money from her former employer. In order to maintain her wealthy lifestyle, she plots to kill Howard and take over the family business, enlisting her younger brother, Evan Wald, to assist in the murder in March 1996. Although suspicion falls around them, the siblings are not caught until 2016. Both are serving 25 years to life. Nurse's aide Marie Poling wishes to trade in her seemingly happy family life after an affair with a young colleague and plots to kill her husband. In January 1988, she shoots husband Richard in his sleep, then enlists her lover and another coworker to help dispose of the body. Her lover is sentenced to thirteen years and released in 2001. Her coworker received an eighteen-month sentence and has since been released. Marie is sentenced to twenty years to life and has been denied parole seven times since her incarceration. Her next parole hearing is in August of 2025. In Orinda, California, brilliant but troubled teenager Susan Mae Bolling is sent to respected child psychiatrist Dr. Felix Polk for help in maintaining her mental health. Instead of counseling her, Felix abuses his position and begins an affair with his naïve patient, marrying Susan when she turns twenty-four and going on to raise three sons. A life of luxury does nothing to cure Susan's demons, though, and after a contentious divorce results in Felix getting both the house and the children, Susan snaps and stabs Felix to death on October 14, 2002. She is serving sixteen years to life, with both her appeal and parole hearing being denied in 2019. She will not be eligible for parole again until 2029.
184	6	"Lethal Lies"	Unknown	Unknown	July 22, 2021
Annette Cahill falls for Corey Wieneke, but she's not the only woman in his life, as he's a known playboy and has gotten one of his other lovers pregnant. A jealous Annette decides if she cannot have Corey, then no one else can either, and bludgeons him to death with a silver baseball bat in October 1992, managing to cover her tracks for the next 25 years until her conscience gets the better of her, as well as a nurse informing a cold case detective about Corey's murder. She is sentenced to 50 years for second-degree murder. Two days into her marriage, Margaret Vandergulik beats her new husband, Patrick Plumbe, over the head with her cane and then tries to stage his death as a car accident in April 2005, all to gain access to his million-dollar estate. After being betrayed by a man (an ex-lover of Margaret's) who told the story of the murder to police, she attempts to get revenge by making up lies about him shooting her in the arm and wanting to kill her, but the police are not convinced. After she's eventually arrested, she is sentenced to nine years in prison but serves only six. Nicole Abusharif is a habitual liar and a psychopath who leads on both her life partner, Rebecca "Becky" Klein, and her girlfriend, Rose Sodaro. In March 2007, Nicole finally chooses between the two and smothers Becky to death by duct taping her head with plastic after forcing Becky into the trunk of her car and leaving her to slowly die from lack of oxygen. Nicole is sentenced to 50 years in prison after Rose testifies against her and must serve all of it before becoming eligible for parole. By then, she will be 76 years old.
185	7	"Ice Cold"	Unknown	Unknown	July 29, 2021
On the run for manufacturing meth, Lisa Jo Chamberlin and her boyfriend, Roger Gillett, are welcomed with open arms into the home of Roger's cousin, Vernon Hullett, and his girlfriend, Linda Heintzelman, in Hattiesburg, Mississippi. The criminal couple soon wears out their welcome, but in March 2004, when Vernon orders them to leave, they brutally attack him and Linda, torturing them both and sexually assaulting Linda, in order to get into Vernon's safe. After murdering the couple, only to find that the safe is empty, Lisa and Roger dismember the bodies and stash them in a freezer on property belonging to Roger's family, who turn the deadly couple in to police. Lisa and Roger are sentenced to death, although Roger's sentence is later overturned to life without parole. Lisa is currently the only woman on death row in Mississippi. In April 1908, new mother Mary Farmer is determined to escape the life of poverty she and her family are living after her husband, James, loses his job and becomes an alcoholic, doing so by taking advantage of her affluent neighbor, Sarah Brennan, forging her name on Sarah's deed, then brutally axing Sarah to death and stuffing her body into a trunk to cover her tracks before evicting Sarah's husband, Patrick. A suspicious Patrick launches an investigation, which ultimately leads to constables finding Sarah's remains stashed in Mary's trunk. Both Mary and James are sentenced to die by electrocution, but Mary writes a letter exonerating her husband before her own execution, and he is released on appeal. Mary's schemes are all for naught, as their son is ultimately sent to an orphanage and possibly a future worse than the poverty from which Mary killed to escape. Carol Dawson and her adult son, Scott, are intensely possessive of their land and determined to keep all trespassers off it, even though the footpath that runs through it is public property. When Gary Dean continues to use the path on his daily exercise runs, the Dawsons retaliate by first launching an unsuccessful false campaign against Gary, and then ultimately ambush Gary in September 2018, with Scott shooting him with an air rifle before cruelly beating him to death at Carol's behest. With evidence from their ongoing dispute with Gary and a silencer that Scott used on the rifle against them, the remorseless mother and son are both convicted of their crime; Scott is serving thirty-two years to life, and Carol is serving twenty-six years to life.
186	8	"Killer Intellect"	Unknown	Unknown	August 5, 2021
Pam Smart has a great career, beauty, and a lovely romance with her new husband, Gregg. However, she falls for a teenage boy named Billy Flynn and starts an affair, which results in a rape scandal at school. As her relationship with Gregg starts to have problems, Pam decides to fix them by hiring Billy and his friends to kill him for her in May 1990. After being arrested for murder, a remorseful Billy pleads guilty and is released back into the community, while ringleader Pam is sentenced to life without parole, a sentence that is permanently upheld after she loses her final appeal on March 29, 2023. Belva Gaertner is a gifted showgirl with beauty, brains, and talent. Throughout her whole life, she finds a few young lovers to have relationships with until her husband discovers her infidelity. After an affair with Walter Law ends, she shoots him in his car in March 1924, and then explained to the cops that she wanted to clean up a "big mess". This statement allowed her to walk free and live in eternal stardom until the day she died, and her story inspired the character of Velma Kelly from the musical Chicago. Tyler Block Patton is a skilled property developer, but also a master manipulator when she meets her new husband Ed. After discovering that he has no money and that his mother is in charge of his trust fund, she becomes frustrated. To solve her welfare problems, she murders her husband before she's caught by the police in January 2001. Because of the recordings and DNA evidence found in the photos, Tyler is sentenced to life without parole for 25 years.
187	9	"Dangerous Liaisons (2nd)"	Unknown	Unknown	August 12, 2021
In Broken Arrow, Oklahoma, Sonia Weidenfelder starts a romantic affair with Rick Spaulding, who is in a legal battle with his ex, Debra "Debbie" Morgan, because of Rick refusing to pay child support. In November 2016, Rick uses Sonia to shoot Debbie in the face at point-blank range in her house while she sleeps. Both are sentenced to forty-seven years to life, with both eligible for parole in 2063. In Henrico, Virginia, Denise Gay falls in love and moves in with widowed coworker Maurice Cole, but she is jealous of the memory of his dead wife, especially his son, Martre, who has not coped with the loss and is a constant reminder. On March 12, 2017, Denise manipulates her daughter, LaToya, into helping her brutally suffocate Martre to death in order to get exactly what she wanted, all witnessed by Denise's thirteen-year-old daughter, Alana. She testifies against her mother and sister, and LaToya receives a thirty-year sentence, while Denise receives life without parole. Martre's family has since forgiven LaToya for the crime, knowing that she was tightly under her mother's thumb and would thus never have committed it otherwise, but have maintained their hatred and disgust toward Denise. Mary Rice is glad to meet her boyfriend, William "Billy" Boyette, after he's released from prison. On January 31, 2017, when Billy's ex, Alicia Greer, accuses him of domestic violence, Billy and Mary murder her and her friend, Jacqueline Moore. Then, for the next eight days, they murder Peggy Broz and Kayla Crocker for their cars in Florida, Alabama, and Georgia. After being cornered in a motel by the cops, Mary surrenders, but Billy cowardly commits suicide to prevent himself from going back to jail. Facing the death penalty, Mary pleads guilty to the killing spree and is sentenced to life without parole.
188	10	"Soulless"	Unknown	Unknown	August 19, 2021
Chelsea Watrous Cook loses her husband Travis and their children due to her depression and severe anorexia. After Travis begins dating Lisa Williams, Chelsea begins stalking both Travis and Lisa. In November 2018, Chelsea shoots Lisa in front of Travis and their children. Showing no remorse, Chelsea pleads guilty and is sentenced to 34 years to life, and is also prohibited from contacting her children. Debby Foxwell is always at her neighbor, Louise Lotz's, throat. It goes on for many years, due to a fence being near her property. After the death of her husband, Paul, who controls the rivalry between them, the two women go from verbal to physical altercations. In August 2019, an argument between the two turns violent when Debby brutally bludgeons Louise with a garden spade. She is sentenced to twenty-one years to life. Tanya Nelson is an aspiring businesswoman who goes to her fortuneteller, Jade Smith, where she tells Tanya to move her business to North Carolina. However, her money problems follow her there and she blames her problems on Jade. In April 2005, Tanya blackmails Phillipe Zamora, a closeted gay man, to travel to California and stab Jade and her daughter Anita. After killing them, they rob their home and pour paint on them to hide the evidence. Remorseful and horrified, Phillipe pleads guilty and receives a twenty-seven-years-to-life sentence. Calm and defiant to the very end, Tanya gets a death sentence and remains on death row.
189	11	"A Ménage of Murder"	Unknown	Unknown	August 26, 2021
Catherina "Cat" Voss is bored being a Navy wife and mother to her husband, Cory, due to her spending problem. When Cory is deployed, Cat takes in a lover named Michael Draven to relieve her boredom. In April 2007, Cat and Michael hire David Runyon to shoot Cory. After the murder, both hitmen point the finger at her. David receives a death sentence and remains on death row, Michael receives two life sentences, while Cat pleads guilty and receives four life sentences without parole plus twenty years. In 1910s Wisconsin, talented schoolteacher Grace Lusk begins a passionate affair with veterinarian David Roberts, but after years of the affair. David breaks the romance after Grace puts a gun at his face. In June 1917, David's wife, Mary, confronts Grace and orders her to stay away, but Grace shoots Mary, then attempts to commit suicide by shooting herself twice in the chest, which backfires. After that, she is sentenced to nineteen years in prison, but just serves three years before receiving a pardon, while David's adultery causes him to spend a year in prison. Angela Taylor has fallen out of love with her millionaire husband, Bill, but not with his money. After Angela and Bill separate, she dates farm hand Paul Canon and uses him to spy on Bill's money so she can win the jackpot. However, Bill tries to win back Angela and refuses to divorce her, but she rejects him time and time again to get her treasure chest. In June 2018, Paul murders Bill on Angela's orders by burning his truck. Both are sentenced to twenty-two years to life.
190	12	"Clean Hands, Dirty Deeds"	Unknown	Unknown	September 2, 2021
In Cleveland, Ohio, Uloma Curry gets impatient when her live-in boyfriend, William Walker, has not proposed to her after eight years of dating, and forces his hand by lying that she has Stage 4 breast cancer. After four months of marriage, Uloma uses up all his money and is in debt. In order to stop William from finding out the truth, Uloma uses her own daughter, Jackie, and her (Jackie's) boyfriend, Chad Padgett, along with his friend, Ryan Dorty, to shoot William on November 3, 2013, for his insurance money. The murder is all for nothing, however, as William's ex-wife turns out to be the beneficiary instead of Uloma, much to Uloma's shock and anger. Jackie is tried as a juvenile and receives one month in prison for delinquency, Chad pleads guilty and receives twenty-eight years, Ryan also pleads guilty and receives twenty-three years to life, and Uloma, as the mastermind, receives life without parole. In Melbourne, Australia, Robyn Lindholm is an exotic dancer who has a strained relationship with her boyfriend, Wayne Amey, due to him wanting a part of her horse farm. On December 10, 2013, Robyn has her new lover, Torsten Trabert, and her friend, John Ryan, stab and strangle Wayne to death. John is sentenced to thirty-one years, and Torsten gets twenty-eight years. As the police continue investigating, they discover, thanks to Robyn's friend, Matilda, that Robyn had Wayne kill her old boyfriend, George Teazis, on May 2, 2005, although his body has never been found. Robyn gets twenty-five years for Wayne's murder, plus an additional twenty-eight years for George's murder, giving her a total of fifty-three years in prison. She is also suspected of the murder of fellow exotic dancer Shari Davison, who has been missing since February 18, 1995. In McKinney, Texas, Thailand-born Chansamorn Pokai is in a love triangle with her husband, Englishman Richard Moore, and his best friend, Stephen Brockway. When Richard discovers Chansamorn's infidelity, an unrepentant Chansamorn, along with Stephen, have Ronald Rosser shoot him to death on February 27, 2015. However, due to several shortsighted mistakes on the three killers' part, the cops quickly catch up to them and arrest all of them for Richard's murder. Ronald gets life without parole, Stephen gets twenty-eight years, and Chansamorn gets forty years.
191	13	"Making A Killing"	Unknown	Unknown	September 9, 2021
In Keller, Texas, Michele Williams has always wanted the best out of life from her men, and her latest husband, Greg, is no exception. Michele immediately spends all of his money and runs his business to the ground. On October 13, 2011, when Greg announces his plans to build a house, Michele becomes desperate to hide her spending habits from him, ultimately shooting Greg. All of her resulting lies and attempts to get away with her crime ultimately fail, and she is sentenced to sixty years, being eligible for parole after serving half of that time. In Victorian London, England, Maria Manning is openly courted by Patrick O'Conner and Frederick Manning, the latter of whom she truly loves, with Maria eventually choosing Frederick based on a lie that he tells her. When Maria discovers his lie and discovers that Patrick still loves her, she decides to sleep with Patrick for money. However, on August 9, 1849, when the agreement is not enough for her, Maria and Frederick shoot and bludgeon Patrick for all of his stock and bonds. Both are sentenced to hang publicly and are hanged together, becoming the first couple hanged together since 1700. One of the witnesses to the hanging was author Charles Dickens, who modeled the murderess character in Bleak House after Maria. In Fort Carson, Colorado, Army soldier Kemia Hassel gets bored when her husband, Tyrone III, is promoted in the Army, as well as his strict lifestyle. While they are deployed in South Korea, Kemia begins an affair with Private Jeremy Cuellar, but the illicit affair is not a secret, and her fellow soldiers tell Tyrone, but he does not confront her, which ends up being a fatal mistake. On New Year's Eve of 2018, when they return to the U.S., Kemia has Jeremy kill Tyrone for his insurance money. Jeremy pleads guilty to second-degree murder and receives sixty-five to ninety years, while Kemia is convicted of first-degree murder and gets life in prison without parole.

== See also ==
- Facing Evil with Candice DeLong
- Snapped
- Snapped: Killer Couples
- Snapped: She Made Me Do It
- Wives with Knives
