= Chelsea (given name) =

- Pronunciation: /ˈtʃɛlsi/, /tʃɛlˈseɪ/ or /ˈtʃɛlsiə/
- Gender: Unisex, now primarily feminine

Origin
- Origin: Old English
- Meaning: "chalk wharf", "chalk landing place"
- Region of origin: England

Other names
- Alternative spelling: Chelsie, Chelsi, Chelsy, Chelcie, Chelci, Chelcy, Chelcey, Chelsey, Chelcea, Chealsy

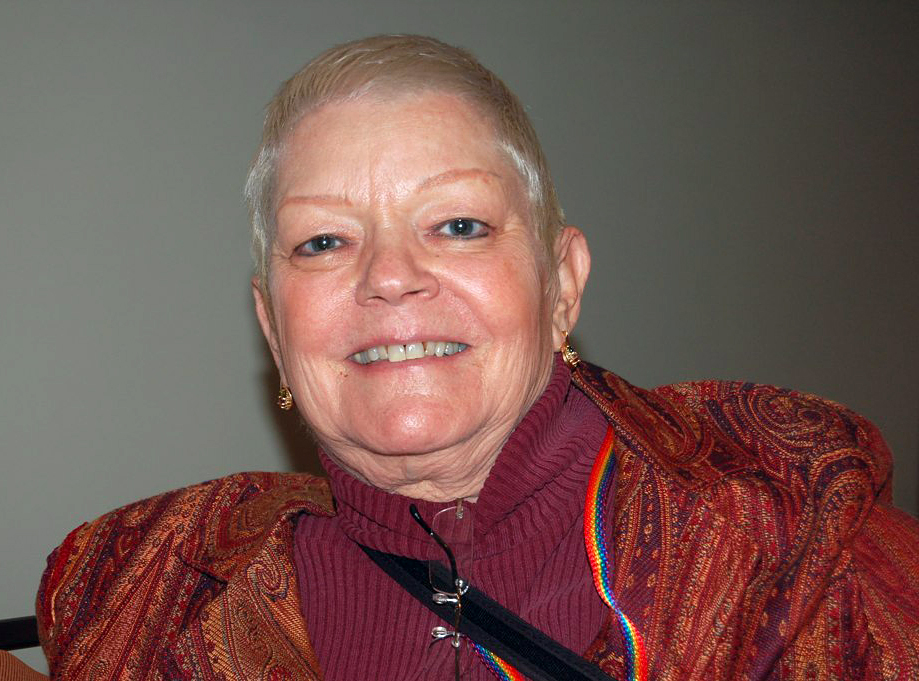
American author Chelsea Quinn Yarbro (1942–2025)

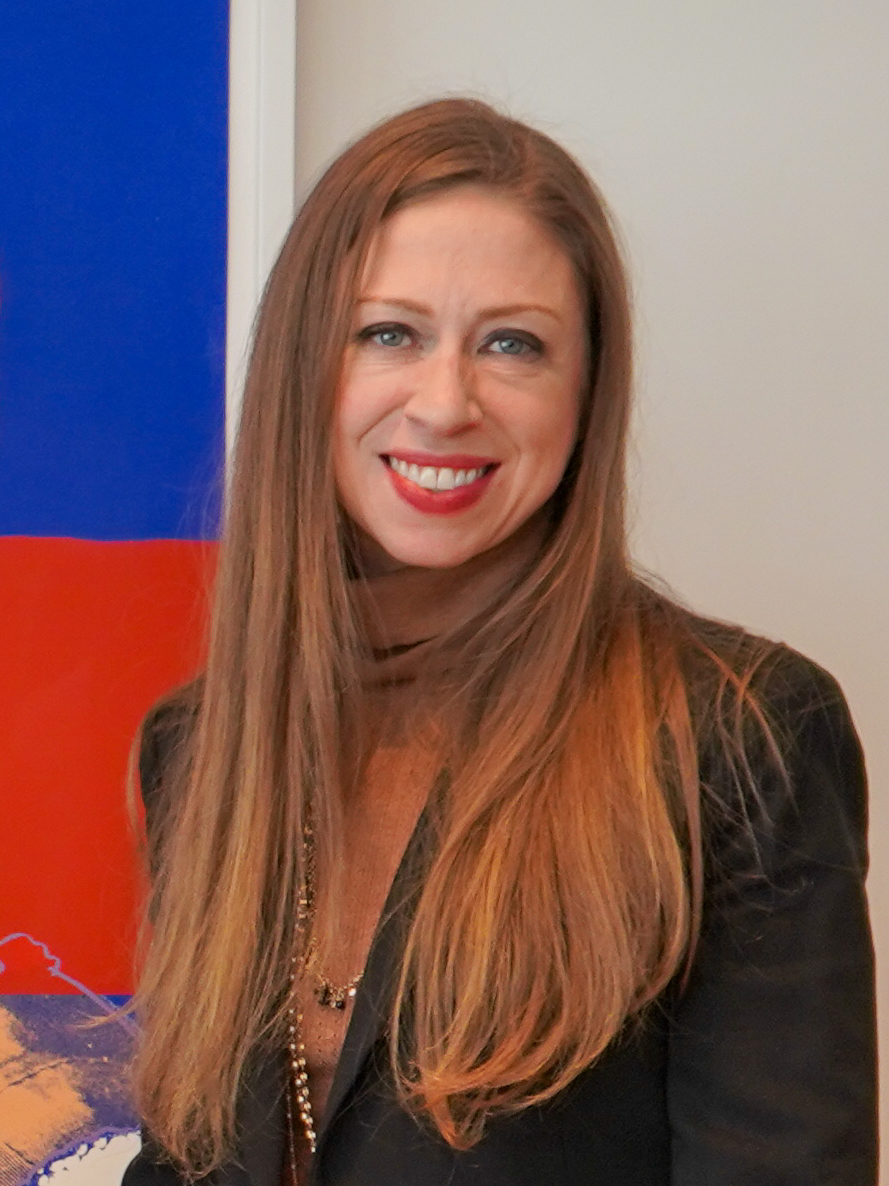
American writer Chelsea Clinton (born 1980.)

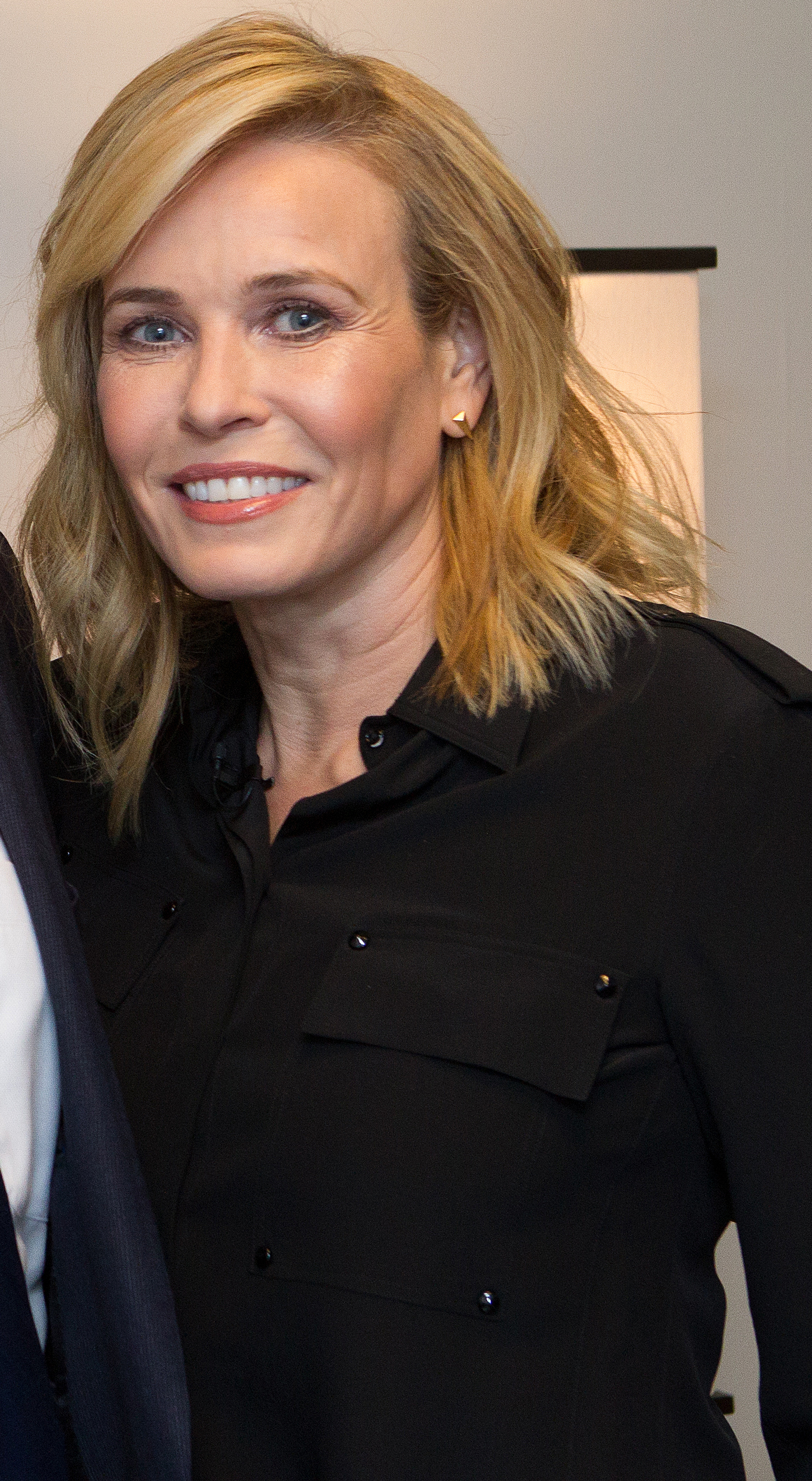
American comedian Chelsea Handler (born 1975.)

Chelsea is an English given name derived from the Old English place name ċealc hȳð, or the modern Celcyth, meaning chalk landing place. The name evolved to Chelsea, a location on the River Thames that became a London borough known for its wealthy, socially influential residents. Many locations have been named after the English place name Chelsea.

== American usage ==
The given name, a transferred use of the place name, was in use for boys in the New England region of the United States by the late 18th century and was first used for American girls in the 1840s.

The name was first popularized for girls in larger numbers in the United States by American comedian Chelsea Brown, who was born Lois Brown but chose Chelsea as a stage name. After Brown began appearing on the American television program Rowan & Martin's Laugh-In in 1968, the name quadrupled in use for American girls to 48 uses that year. The name debuted among the 1,000 most popular names for American girls in 1969, in 702nd place. Chelsea Morning, a 1969 hit song written about mornings in Chelsea, Manhattan by Canadian singer Joni Mitchell and later performed by Judy Collins, further popularized the name for girls with its descriptive lyrics such as "the light poured in like butterscotch."

The name of Chelsea Clinton, daughter of American President Bill Clinton and former U.S. Secretary of State Hillary Rodham Clinton, was inspired by the song when she was born in 1980. The name Chelsea increased further in popularity in the 1980s due to its use for film and television characters, such as Chelsea Thayer Wayne, a character played by Jane Fonda in the 1981 American film On Golden Pond and Chelsea Reardon, a character played by Kassie DePaiva on the American soap opera Guiding Light beginning in 1986. In 1992, the name reached peak popularity in the United States and would have been the eighth most popular name for American girls in that year if all spellings of the name were combined. The name dramatically declined in use in 1993, during the first year of Bill Clinton's presidency. At the time, it was out of fashion in the United States to name children after politicians and those who were associated with them. The name has continued to decline in use, but remained among the 1,000 most popular names for American girls in 2023.

Spelling variants in use in the United States include Chelsey, Chelsi, Chelsie, and Chelsy.

== World usage ==
The name has also been in regular use throughout the Anglosphere, including Australia, Canada, Ireland, New Zealand, and the United Kingdom, as well as in Belgium, France and Netherlands.

== Notable women ==
=== Chelsea ===
- Chelsea, ring name of American actress, model, television personality, dancer, and former professional wrestling valet Alison Skipper
- Chelsea Abdullah, Kuwaiti-American writer
- Chelsea Alden (born 1988), American actress
- Chelsea Angelo (born 1996), Australian racecar driver
- Chelsea Ashurst (born 1990), English professional footballer
- Chelsea Aubry (born 1984), Canadian professional basketball player
- Chelsea Baker (born 1986), Australian NRLW player
- Chelsea Barber, British cast member of Geordie Shore (series 14)
- Chelsea Biddell (born 1998), Australian AFLW player
- Chelsea Brandwood, Canadian curler
- Chelsea Bremner (born 1995), New Zealand rugby union player
- Chelsea Brook (born 1998), Australian WNBL player
- Chelsea Brown (1942–2017), American actress, comedian, and dancer
- Chelsea Buckland (born 1990), Canadian soccer player
- Chelsea Cain (born 1972), American writer of novels and columns
- Chelsea Carey (born 1984), Canadian curler
- Chelsea Cawley, Irish murder victim
- Chelsea Chandler (born 1994), American mixed martial artist
- Chelsea Charms (born 1976), American big-bust model, Internet model, and stripper
- Chelsea Chen (born 1983), American organist and composer
- Chelsea Chenault (born 1994), American swimmer
- Chelsea Clark (athlete) (1983–2014), Canadian Paralympic athlete
- Chelsea Clark (actress) (born 1998), Canadian actress
- Chelsea Clinton (born 1980), American writer, global health advocate, and daughter of former U.S. President Bill Clinton and former U.S. Secretary of State Hillary Clinton
- Chelsea Connor, Dominican herpetologist and birder
- Chelsea Cook, American lawyer and politician
- Chelsea Cooley (born 1983), American actress, singer, model, and beauty pageant titleholder
- Chelsea Cornet (born 1998), Scottish SWPL player
- Chelsea Corputty (born 1995), Indonesian rower
- Chelsea Cullen (born 1994), Australian pop singer
- Chelsea Cutler (born 1997), American singer-songwriter and producer
- Chelsea Davis (born 1992), American artistic gymnast
- Chelsea Davis, American diver at the 2005 World Aquatics Championships
- Chelsea Dawn Gerlach, American criminal
- Chelsea Dickenson (born 1990), British travel blogger and social media influencer
- Chelsea Domond (born 1999), American-born Haitian footballer
- Chelsea Dungee (born 1997), American basketball player and assistant coach
- Chelsea Edghill (born 1997), Guyanese table tennis player
- Chelsea Eze (born 1985), Nigerian actress
- Chelsea Field (born 1957), American actress
- Chelsea Finn, American computer scientist and assistant professor
- Chelsea Forkin (born 1989), Western Australian softball- and baseball player
- Chelsea Frei, American actress
- Chelsea Georgeson (born 1983), Australian surfer
- Chelsea Gonzales (born 1995), American WPF player
- Chelsea Goodacre (born 1993), American professional softball catcher
- Chelsea Gray (born 1992), American WNBA player
- Chelsea Green (born 1991), Canadian professional wrestler, stuntwoman, and model
- Chelsea Gubecka (born 1998), Australian swimmer
- Chelsea Hackett (born 1999), Australian kickboxer, mixed martial artist, and muay thai fighter
- Chelsea Halfpenny (born 1991), English actress
- Chelsea Hammond (born 1983), Jamaican long jumper
- Chelsea Handler (born 1975), American comedian, actress, writer, television host, and producer
- Chelsea Hardin (born 1991), American model, public speaker, and beauty pageant titleholder
- Chelsea Harris (born 1990), American actress
- Chelsea Hayes (born 1988), American track and field athlete
- Chelsea Hobbs (born 1985), Canadian actress
- Chelsea Hodges (born 2001), Australian swimmer
- Chelsea Holmes, American comedian, actress, and writer
- Chelsea Holmes (skier) (born 1987), American cross-country skier
- Chelsea Islan (born 1995), American-born Indonesian actress, model, and activist
- Chelsea Jackson Roberts, American fitness coach and Peloton instructor
- Chelsea Jade (born 1989), South African-born New Zealand singer-songwriter and record producer
- Chelsea Jaensch (born 1985), Australian long jumper
- Chelsea Jane (born 1992), Australian rapper and songwriter
- Chelsea Jarvis (born 1992), Canadian curler
- Chelsea Johnson (born 1983), American pole vaulter
- Chelsea Kane (born 1988), American actress and singer
- Chelsea King (1992–2010), American murder victim
- Chelsea Krost (born 1991), American speaker, author, television- and radio talk show host, executive producer, health coach, and entrepreneur
- Chelsea Laden (born 1992), American television creator and retired PHF goaltender
- Chelsea Lankes, American electro-pop musician
- Chelsea Lariviere, Canadian Paralympic athlete
- Chelsea Lenarduzzi (born 1995), Australian NRLW- and QRL player
- Chelsea Lewis (disambiguation), several people
- Chelsea Leyland, English DJ, cannabis- and epilepsy activist, and model
- Chelsea Liu (born 1999), American pair skater
- Chelsea Makela (born 1990), American actress, writer, and designer
- Chelsea Malone (born 1992), American beauty pageant titleholder
- Chelsea Manalo (born 1999), Filipino beauty pageant titleholder.
- Chelsea Manning (born 1987), American activist, whistleblower, and former soldier convicted of violating the Espionage Act of 1917
- Chelsea Marcantel, American playwright and director
- Chelsea Marriner, New Zealand dog handler and trainer
- Chelsea Marshall (born 1986), American alpine ski racer
- Chelsea Martin (born 1986), American author and illustrator
- Chelsea McClammer (born 1994), American Paralympic athlete
- Chelsea McClellan, American murder victim
- Chelsea McMullan, Canadian documentary filmmaker
- Chelsea Meissner, American contestant on Survivor (American TV series)
- Chelsea Muco (born 1997), Swedish singer
- Chelsea Newton (born 1983), American basketball coach and player
- Chelsea Nikkel (born 1985), New Zealand producer, musician, and visual artist
- Chelsea Noble (born 1964), American actress
- Chelsea Olivia (born 1992), Indonesian-Chinese actress and pop singer
- Chelsea Peretti (born 1978), American comedian, actress, television writer, singer, and songwriter
- Chelsea Pinnix, American oncologist and associate professor
- Chelsea Pitman (born 1988), Australian-born netball player
- Chelsea Poppens (born 1991), American professional basketball player
- Chelsea Purcell (born 1987), Canadian EWHL-, CWHL-, WWHL-, and CIS player
- Chelsea Quinn Yarbro (1942–2025), American writer
- Chelsea Randall (born 1991), Australian AFLW player
- Chelsea Rathburn (born 1975), American poet
- Chelsea Richardson (born 1984), American convicted murderer
- Chelsea Rochman (born 1981), American marine and freshwater ecologist
- Chelsea Roffey (born 1981), Australian journalist and AFL player
- Chelsea Semple (born 1992), New Zealand rugby union player
- Chelsea Sexton (born 1975), American electric car advocate and advisor
- Chelsea Singh, English contestant on Big Brother (British series 17)
- Chelsea Sodaro (born 1989), American professional triathlete
- Chelsea Sorrell, American contestant on American Idol (season 11)
- Chelsea Spencer (born 1983), American professional softball player and coach
- Chelsea Spencer (born 1993), English bowls player
- Chelsea Stewart (born 1990), Canadian soccer player
- Chelsea Surpris (born 1996), American-born Haitian professional footballer
- Chelsea Tavares (born 1991), American actress and singer
- Chelsea Tayui (born 1995), Ghanaian model and beauty pageant titleholder
- Chelsea Thomas (born 1990), American collegiate softball pitcher
- Chelsea Townsend, American contestant on Survivor (American TV series)
- Chelsea Valois (born 1987), Canadian bobsledder
- Chelsea Verhaegh (born 2000), Dutch figure skater
- Chelsea Vowel, Métis writer, professor, and lawyer
- Chelsea Walker, American contestant on Survivor (American TV series)
- Chelsea Walton (born 1983), African-American mathematician
- Chelsea Watego (born 1978/1979), Aboriginal Australian academic and writer
- Chelsea Weston (born 1990), English footballer
- Chelsea Winstanley (born 1976), New Zealand film producer
- Chelsea Winter, New Zealand celebrity chef, entrepreneur, food writer, and television personality
- Chelsea Wolfe (born 1983), American singer-songwriter and musician
- Chelsea Wolfe (BMX cyclist), American Olympian
- Chelsea Zhang (born 1996), American actress

=== Chelcie ===
- Chelcie Lynn, American YouTuber, actress, and stand-up comedian
- Chelcie Ross (born 1942), American character actor

=== Chellsie ===
- Chellsie Memmel (born 1988), American artistic gymnast

=== Chelsey ===
- Chelsey Branham, Native American politician
- Chelsey Brodt-Rosenthal (born 1983), American NWHL player
- Chelsey Crisp (born 1983), American actress, comedian, and writer
- Chelsey Edwards (born 2001), New Zealand swimmer
- Chelsey Glasson (born 1982/1983), American user researcher, author, and workers’ rights advocate
- Chelsey Goldberg (born 1993), American PWHPA player
- Chelsey Gotell (born 1986), Canadian Paralympic swimmer
- Chelsey Gullickson (born 1990), American professional tennis player
- Chelsey Heijnen (born 1999), Dutch amateur boxer
- Chelsey Hersley, American contestant on America's Next Top Model (season 15)
- Chelsey Johnson, American author and professor
- Chelsey Lee (born 1989), American basketball player
- Chelsey Matson (born 1982), Canadian curler
- Chelsey Minnis (born 1970), American poet
- Chelsey Perry (born 1999), American WNBA player
- Chelsey Reist (born 1987), Canadian actress, television host, and dancer
- Chelsey Tregear (born 1983), Australian netball player

=== Chelsee ===
- Chelsee Healey (born 1988), English actress

=== Chelsi ===
- Chelsi Guillen (born 1993), American competitive pair skater
- Chelsi Smith (1973–2018), American actress, singer, television host, and beauty queen

=== Chelsie ===
- Chelsie Aryn (born 1992), American 2015 Playboy model
- Chelsie Dawber (born 2000), Australian NWSL player
- Chelsie Giles (born 1997), British judoka
- Chelsie Hightower (born 1989), American ballroom dancer
- Chelsie J. Senerchia (1899–1990), Italian American politician and civil engineer
- Chelsie Monica Ignesias Sihite (born 1995), Indonesian chess player and Twitch streamer
- Chelsie Preston Crayford (born 1987), New Zealand actress
- Chelsie Schweers (born 1989), American professional basketball player

=== Chelsy ===
- Chelsy Davy (born 1985), Zimbabwean businesswoman

== Notable men ==
=== Chelsea ===
- Chelsea Curtis Fraser (1876–1954), Canadian-born American teacher, prolific author of nonfiction books for children and visual artist
- Chelsea Quealey (1905–1950), American jazz trumpeter

=== Chelsie ===
- Chelsie J. Senerchia (1899–1990), Italian-American politician and civil engineer

=== Chelcie ===
- Chelcie Ross (born 1942), American character actor

== Fictional entities ==
- Chelsea B., the name of Nina Sabrina Flores’ best friend in the Sprout animated spin-off of The Good Night Show, called Nina's World
- Chelsea Barnes, the antagonist in the 2009 Disney Channel Original Movie Princess Protection Program, played by Jamie Chung
- Chelsea Benson, in the US soap opera Days of Our Lives, played by Mandy Musgrave and Rachel Melvin
- Chelsea Brimmer, in the US sitcom The Suite Life of Zack & Cody, played by Brittany Curran
- Chelsea Campbell, in the Australian TV soap opera Home and Away, played by Ashleigh Brewer
- Chelsea Cunningham, in Batman Beyond, played by Rachael Leigh Cook
- Chelsea Daniels, in the US sitcom That's So Raven, later Chelsea Grayson in the spinoff Raven's Home, played by Anneliese van der Pol
- Chelsea Fox, in the UK soap opera EastEnders, played by Tiana Benjamin and Zaraah Abrahams
- Chelsea Lawson, in the US soap opera The Young and the Restless, played by Melissa Claire Egan
- Chelsea Lewis (South of Nowhere), in the US TV show South of Nowhere, played by Aasha Davis
- Chelsea Melini, in the US sitcom Two and a Half Men, played by Jennifer Taylor
- Chelsea Murphy, in the Australian TV soap opera Home and Away, played by Georgia Gorman
- Chelsea Roberts, formerly Kelly and the title protagonist's little sister in the Barbie franchise
- Chelsea the Congratulations Fairy, in the children's book series Rainbow Magic
- Chelsie the Magic Cow, in comic book/strip Knights of the Dinner Table
- Chelsea, the Clockwork Fairy Princess of Sega's Clockwork Knight
- Chelsea Van Der Zee, the main antagonist of Ruby Gillman, played by Annie Murphy
- Chelsea, in the Japanese manga Akame ga Kill!
- Chelsea, a main character in the third season of The White Lotus, played by Aimee Lou Wood
