= An American Affair =

An American Affair may refer to:

- An American Affair (2008 film), an American independent period drama film
- An American Affair (1997 film), a Canadian thriller film
- An American Affair (EP), an EP by Spanish singer and songwriter Juan Ricondo

== See also ==
- American Affairs, an American political journal
