= Lola Langusta =

- Born: Sarah Roa; Tampa, Florida
- Genres: Disco, EDM, electropop, electro house
- Occupation(s): DJ, music producer, Creative Director, Stylist
- Years active: 2008–present
- Labels: Monstertooth Records
- Website: lolalangusta.com

Lola Langusta is a fashion DJ, music producer, stylist and creative director.

== Early life ==
She was born a fashion baby, and not because she was surrounded by it, but because she was drawn to it. She grew up with very little so she needed to be creative, and did her best to mock the trends with thrift-store finds. She decided if she couldn’t walk the runway, she would do the hair, makeup, styling, and designing instead.

== Career ==
=== DJ career ===
Langusta is a regular at parties held by Valentino, Universal Music Group, and in 2012 worked with Interview (magazine) & Maserati on their special journey "Through Laure's Lens," experiencing Valentino's Pop Pois collection for Art Basel. In 2014 Lola played again in Art Basel for Interview Magazine with Dean and Dan Caten celebrating the 10th Anniversary Performa. The summer of 2015 she played at the Full Moon Festival in New York, alongside fr:Wolf + Lamb, Pillow Talk, Tensnake and Yelle. In the same year, she played with Dj Harvey in Art Basel for an event hosted By Whitewall Magazine & BABËL. During that time she also played with Mia Moretti for the Museum of Modern Art Design Store Installation featuring limited edition Andy Warhol Campbell's Soup Cans skate decks at Delano South Beach. In 2016 Lola performed with Prince Royce for the world premiere of MAC makeup's Selena Quintanilla inspired collection in the legend's hometown Corpus Christi. In 2017 Lola worked with Louis Vuitton Americas, celebrating the newly renovated Louis Vuitton SoHo store with architect Peter Marino and featured artist, Shuji Mukai.

She currently resides in New York City and Los Angeles

=== Discography ===
In 2017 Langusta released two singles with Monstertooth Records

==== Singles ====
- Shine (Monstertooth, 2017)
- Bondi featuring Lightning Fantasy (Monstertooth, 2017)

=== Creative Direction & Styling ===
In 2017 Langusta started doing creative direction and styling for Stoned Fox Magazine. She has worked with top models like Jessica White, Norway top model winner Kamilla Alnes, and Chelsea Leyland.
