= Azède Jean-Pierre =

American fashion designer

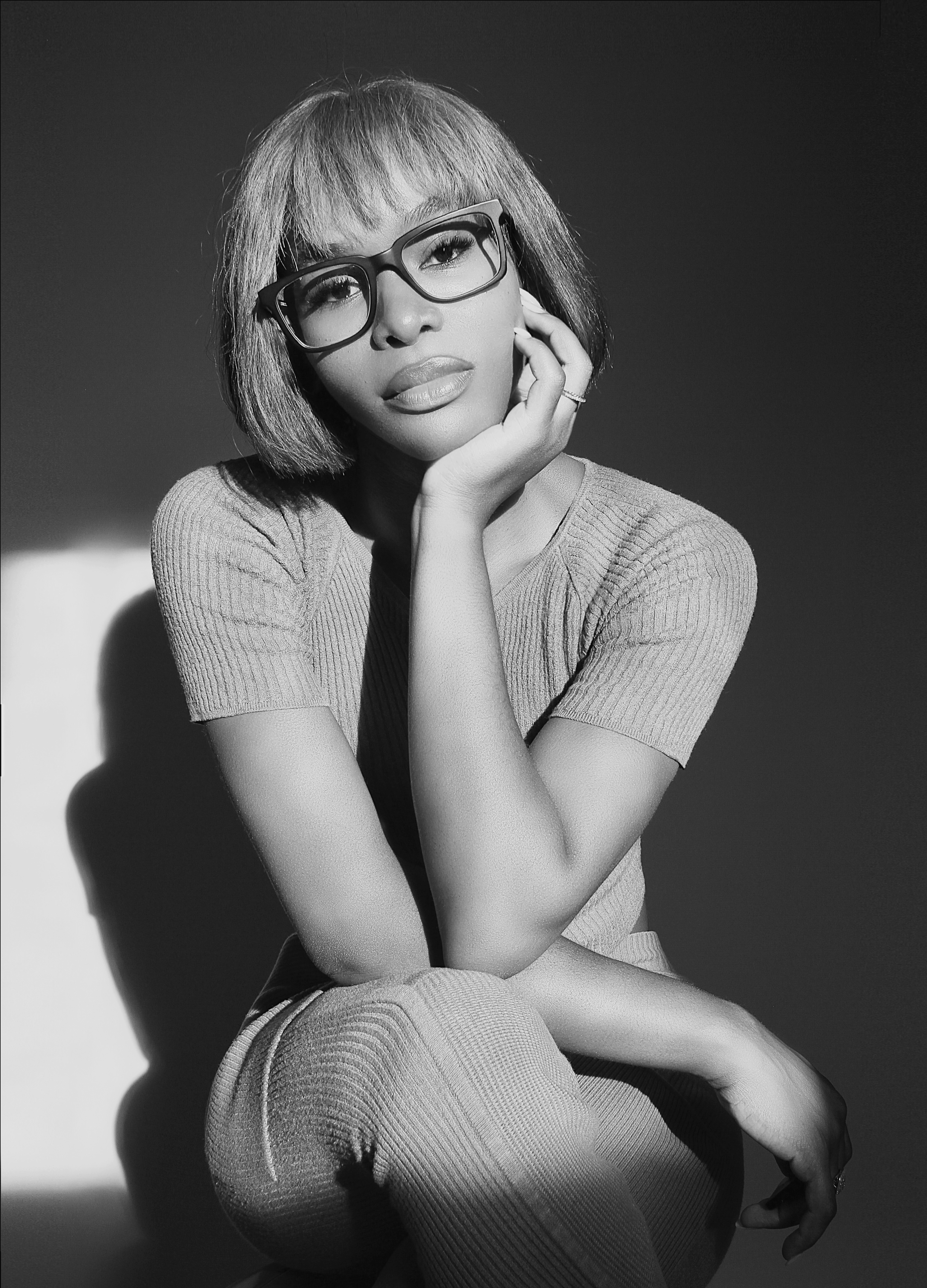
- Jean-Pierre in 2021
- Born: Atlanta, Georgia
- Education: Savannah College of Art and Design, Institut Français de la Mode
- Occupation: Fashion designer
- Website: https://azedejeanpierre.com

Azède Jean-Pierre is an American fashion designer. She is the founder of the Azède Jean-Pierre label and AJP Consulting.

== Early life and education ==
Azède Jean-Pierre grew up in Atlanta, Georgia. Her interest in fashion was supported by Atlanta Mayor Shirley Franklin, who provided her with a scholarship to the Savannah College of Art and Design (SCAD). Jean-Pierre also designed a dress for Franklin for the Mayor's Mask Ball during her junior year at SCAD. She later attended the Institut Français de la Mode in Paris, earning a Master of Arts degree with a specialization in Knitwear.

== Career ==
=== Launch of Azede Jean-Pierre label ===
In 2012, Jean-Pierre launched her eponymous label in New York,. Her collections have been featured in publications Vogue, InStyle,, Glamour,, WWD, and Elle, and have been worn by Michelle Obama, Solange Knowles, Lady Gaga, Angie Harman Chelsea Leyland, Hannah Bronfman and Gabrielle Union. In 2016, Forbes included Azède in their '30 Under 30' list, highlighting her designs and impact on the fashion industry.

Jean-Pierre designed a custom dress for Michelle Obama for the cover of Essence magazine in 2012. Additionally, she participated in Obama's Reach Higher 2020 initiative at the White House, mentoring students in product development.

Jean-Pierre collaborated with the singer songwriter Solange Knowles on a playlist for her fashion show in 2014. She had shows in the New York Fashion Week in 2014 and Paris Fashion Week in 2017, of which the latter was presented in collaboration with Shala Monroque.

In 2017, Jean-Pierre began providing design and creative consulting services under AJP Consulting for various brands, including Gucci, Billy Reid, Intermix, and Pyer Moss.

=== Collaborations ===
In 2021 Jean-Pierre collaborated with Gucci, where she designed a capsule knitwear collection. This collaboration involved working with cross-functional teams in New York and Milan and included a marketing campaign where Jean-Pierre involved collaborators such as "Atlanta" series writer/director Ibra Ake, three-time Grammy winner Wyclef Jean who developed an original song, and choreographer Fatima Robinson. The campaign featured models Alton Mason and Ebony Riley and supported the charity Core Response.

== Philanthropy and mentorship ==
Jean-Pierre participated in Michelle Obama's Reach Higher initiative in 2020, where she mentored students in product development. Her collaboration with Gucci include charitable components, such as donations to organizations supporting underrepresented communities. She has traveled to Haiti to work with and tour with native artisans.
