= Juan Ricondo =

Spanish singer-songwriter (born 1985)

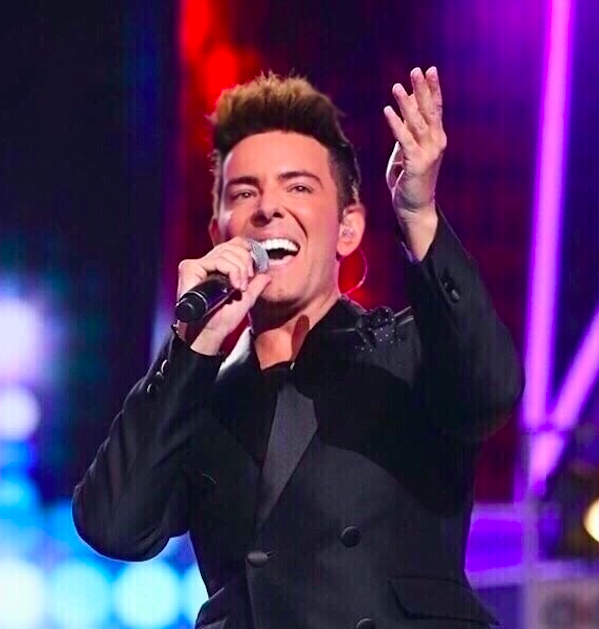
- Ricondo performing at New Wave (competition) in 2019
- Born: Juan Ricondo Vallejo; 15 January 1985; Santander, Cantabria, Spain
- Occupations: Singer; Songwriter; Actor; Creative
- Years active: 2005–present
- Awards: New Wave (competition) 2019 People's Choice
- Musical career
- Genres: Pop; Latin; R&B; Soul; Jazz
- Instruments: Vocals; Guitar
- Label: American Affair Music
- Website: juanricondo.com

Juan Ricondo Vallejo (15 January 1985) better known as Juan Ricondo is a Spanish singer, songwriter and actor. His debut album An American Affair was released in October 2015. It was recorded in Los Angeles and produced by JD Salbego and Sean Hamilton. In August 2019, He won the "People's Choice Awards" at the New Wave competition in Sochi.

== Early life ==
Juan Ricondo was born on 15 January 1985 in Santander, Spain. Ricondo is the first artist of his family, He is the oldest of two brothers and since he was young he dreamed of being an artist. He went to the law school and graduated at the University of Cantabria, at the same time he was studying acting at the local school of acting in Santander (Palacio de Festivales de Cantabria). Soon after, he moved to Madrid to continue his acting studies at the "Chekhov Theatre School". He worked in all kinds of jobs while he was auditioning for films and TV shows. He got a small role in the television show Ugly Betty, He also started singing with the local bands in clubs and pubs of Madrid and writing his first songs which was published on Myspace.

== Career ==
In 2005, he received a scholarship from his hometown, to study at the Lee Strasberg Theatre and Film Institute in New York City. He then found interest listening to artist like Frank Sinatra, Tony Bennett, Dinah Washington and soon after he formed a band and started playing in local clubs across Manhattan. At the Acting school, one of his teacher Paul Calderon suggested him to dedicate professionally into music. Soon he discovered that music was what he really wanted to do. One of his vocal teacher was Gary Catona. In 2011 he participates as a guest performing artist at the German beauty contest, Miss Germany 2011. In 2018 Ricondo presented "The J.R Show, A Hollywood Story" at the "Teatro Calderon" in Madrid. A tour-show inspired by the American T.V. shows from the 60s.

== Discography ==
=== Studio albums ===
Title	Details
An American Affair	Released: 2015; Format: Digital download, CD, Vinyl

=== Singles ===
Year	Title	Album
2019	Crocodile Rock	Non-album single
2018	Un día Más	Non-album single
2017	Háblame	Non-album single
2016	Like a Lullaby	Non-album single
2015	Solo Pienso En Ti	Non-album single

== Honors and awards ==
=== New Wave Music Festival ===
The New Wave (competition) is an annual international television competition held in Sochi.

Year	Nominated	Category	Result
2019	Juan Ricondo	People's Choice Award	Won

== Tours ==
- The J.R Show. A Hollywood Story Tour (2018)

== Filmography ==
=== T.V Shows ===
Year	Title	Role	Director	Notes
2009	Ugly Betty	Javier Lagasca	Rafael de la Cueva	main role

=== T.V appearances ===
- Antena3 (2015) – Interview
- Telemundo Acceso Total (2016) – Guest Artist
- Fashion TV Moscow (2019) – Interview
- New Wave (competition) (2019) – Guest Artist
