= Tunde Oyeneyin =

African American makeup artist and fitness instructor

- Occupations: Makeup artist, cycling instructor

Tunde Oyeneyin (/ˈtʊndeɪ ˌoʊjəˈneɪn/) is an American makeup artist and Peloton cycling instructor.

== Biography ==
Oyeneyin is of Nigerian descent and grew up in Katy, Texas. She graduated from Taylor High School in 2004. Growing up she struggled with her weight and was often the largest girl in her class.

Although she'd previously met other instructors, Oyeneyin was recruited to try out for Peloton on Instagram by Cody Rigsby; she initially thought it was a hoax until noticing his blue check mark. She didn't pass the first tryout, but Rigsby encouraged her to try again, resulting in a position with the company. In June 2020 she collaborated with fellow instructor, Chelsea Jackson Roberts, on a 30-minute class called "Speak Up" in response to Black Lives Matter actions following the murders of George Floyd and Ahmaud Arbery, the shooting of Breonna Taylor, and others. Featuring quotes from Black Peloton colleagues and music by Black artists, the class had been viewed 110,000 times by late July. She is also known for wearing clothing that matches Peloton's artist series, including a themed outfit inspired by Beyoncé's appearance at the 2013 Grammys. In December 2020 Oyeneyin was announced as one of the instructors participating in Shonda Rhimes' Year of Yes themed Peloton classes.

Oyeneyin is a founder of the SPEAK Movement. Prior to becoming a Peloton instructor, Oyeneyin worked as a makeup artist for more than a decade in Los Angeles. She also appeared as a contestant on Deal or No Deal in 2009. In addition to cycling instruction, Oyeneyin is the founder of S.P.E.A.K. (Surrender, Power, Empathy, Authenticity and Knowledge), an Instagram Live series aimed at giving a platform to those facing adversity. In November 2020, she spoke about her career as a makeup artist and fitness instructor as a guest on the podcast Forever35.

Oyeneyin signed with Wasserman Media Group in September 2020.
