= Chelsea Krost =

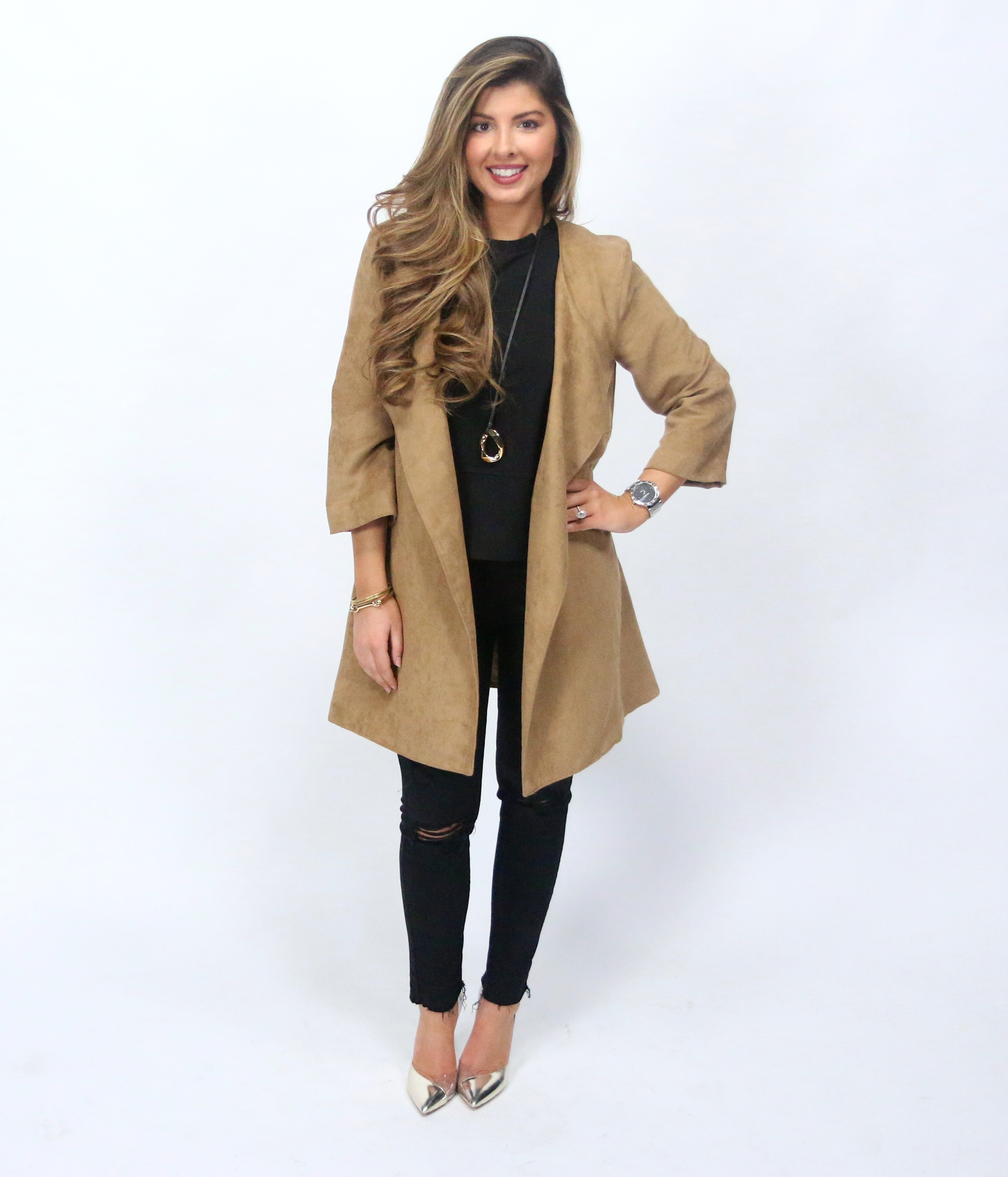
- Born: Chelsea Morgan Krost; February 2, 1991 (age 35); Long Island, New York
- Occupations: TV and radio personality
- Years active: 2007–present
- Known for: The Chelsea Krost Radio Show
- Website: chelseakrost.com

Chelsea Morgan Krost (born February 2, 1991) is an American speaker, author, television and radio talk-show host, executive producer, health coach, and entrepreneur.

== Career ==
=== Radio ===
From 2008 through 2011, Krost wrote and produced Teen Talk Live, a teen-oriented radio show on WBZT 1230 AM, Palm Beaches' Talk Station, Boca Raton, Florida.

In 2012, the show was renamed to The Chelsea Krost Radio Show, when the first episode for the re-branded show was produced and aired in November on Blog Talk Radio.

=== Television ===
Krost has appeared as a guest contributor for television news shows, commenting on social issues faced by the Millennial Generation.

In 2013, Philadelphia broadcast television station WMCN and national production company, Studio City, launched The Chelsea Krost Show, a talk-show platform discussing trends, issues and the culture of the Millennial Generation, and aired eight episodes from May through June 2013.

=== Online media ===
She is a regular contributor to Life, Love & Shopping, a subsidiary of The daily buzz. Krost is also a contributor for online programming including Answers.com, Galtime.com. She is also a regular contributing blogger for Intel for Change, as well as being a commentator for MasterCard.

Krost is the host of #MillennialTalk Twitter Chat.

=== Print media ===
In 2011, Krost published A Reflection of My Teenage Experience in an Extraordinary Life. It was released by Jacquie Jordan Inc Publishing.

In June 2011 and 2012, Krost co-produced and hosted the New York City Women's Empowerment Summit with VIP Talent Connect. Offering color commentary in print and online, Krost discussed the details of this one-day conference. During Advertising Week in September 2013, in New York City, Krost served as a contributing panelist for Cosmopolitan Magazine's marketing to millennials break-out session called, "Miss-Perception: Disrupting Millennial Myths and Stereotypes".

== Spokesperson and philanthropy ==
Chelsea sat on the board of Cosmopolitan Magazine as a Millennial board member and has promoted brands such as Intel and MasterCard.

In 2009, Krost became a spokesperson for U by Kotex, publishing six blogs for the organization from January 2010 through October 2013 on a variety of subjects about gynecological education and well-being. As U by Kotex spokesperson, Krost traveled to Nairobi, Africa in 2009 to educate young women about sanitary hygiene products and the importance of staying in school. She delivered feminine hygiene products to the HEART Freedom for Girls Program and the Nyumbani Children's Home. The 10-day journey was documented for CBS and Fox News affiliates in Florida through a four-part special called "Mission to Africa." Since then, Krost has been a part of mission trips to Peru, Joplin Missouri, and South Africa serving an educational role for young women.
