= Susan Williams (marine biologist) =

American marine biologist

Susan L. Williams
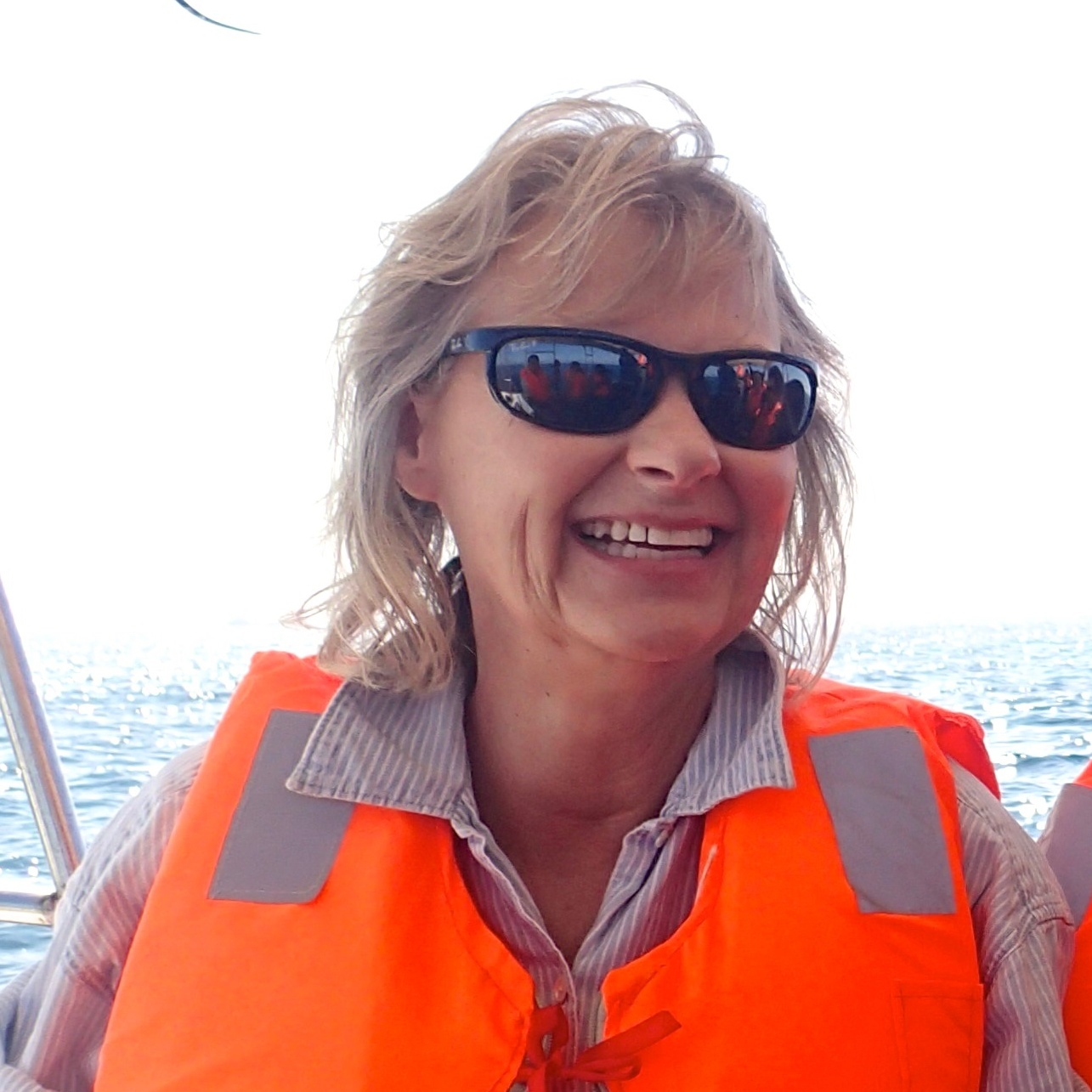
- Williams in Indonesia, 2013
- Born: June 21, 1951
- Died: April 24, 2018 (aged 66); Petaluma, California
- Education: University of Michigan, BS in Biology (1972); University of Alaska, MS in Biological Oceanography (1977); University of Maryland, PhD in Botany and Marine Biology (1981)
- Known for: marine biology, climate change
- Awards: Fellow of the American Association for the Advancement of Science
- Scientific career
- Fields: marine biology, oceanography, ecology
- Workplaces: University of California, Davis; San Diego State University

Susan Lynn Williams (June 21, 1951 – April 24, 2018) was an American marine biologist and Distinguished Professor of Evolution and Ecology at the University of California, Davis, where she directed the Bodega Marine Laboratory from 2000-2010. She researched marine coastal ecosystems (in particular seagrass, seaweed, and coral reef habitats) and how they are affected by human activities. She was a strong advocate for environmental protection, credited with helping pass legislation expanding the boundaries of Northern California's Gulf of the Farallones and Cordell Bank national sanctuaries, increasing the area of federally-protected coastal waters.

== Early life and education ==
In 1969, Susan Lynn Williams graduated from William Penn Senior High School. Williams attended the University of Michigan, where she earned a bachelor's of science degree in biology in 1972. She then earned a master's degree in biological oceanography from the University of Alaska in 1977 and a doctoral degree in botany and marine biology from the University of Maryland in 1981.

== Career ==
Williams served as science director of the United States National Oceanographic and Atmospheric Administration's National Undersea Research Program in the Virgin Islands before becoming a professor of biology at San Diego State University, where she directed the University's Coastal and Marine Institute.

Williams joined the faculty of the University of California, Davis in 2000 and served as director of the University's Bodega Marine Laboratory between 2000 and 2010. She returned to teaching full-time in 2010 and remained on the UC Davis faculty until her death from a traffic collision in Petaluma, California on April 24, 2018. She taught and mentored both undergraduate and graduate students, including teaching a course called "Life in the Sea" which she developed to help get non science-majors inspired to help protect marine environments.

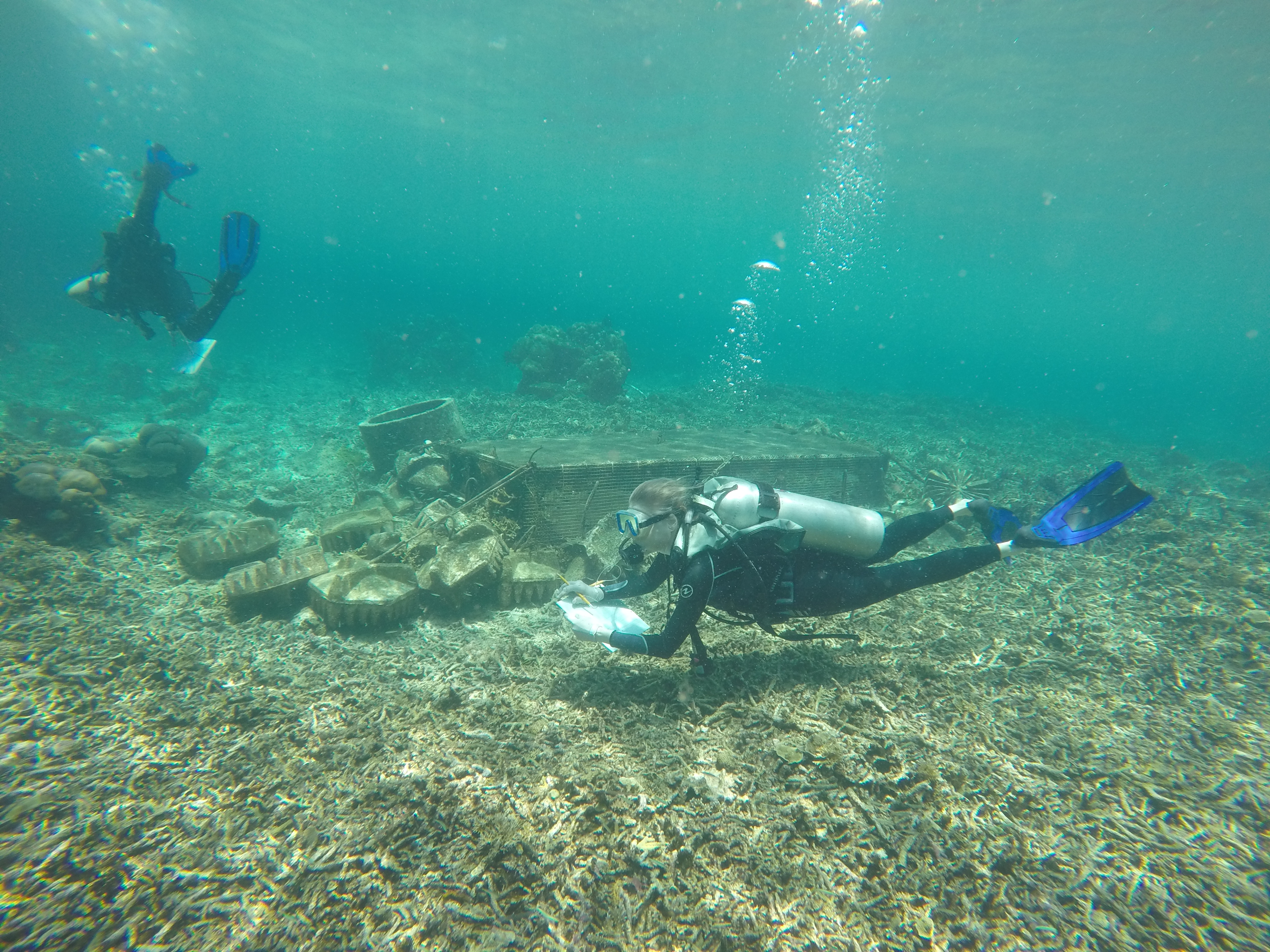
Williams diving off the Spermonde islands in Indonesia

Williams served as president of the Coastal and Estuarine Research Federation from 2009 to 2011.

Williams worked closely with Indonesian researchers throughout her career: in 2015, she co-authored a study that looked at the effects of human pollution on fish for sale in California and Indonesia. They found that a quarter of the fish from the California Bay Area they tested and an even greater proportion of the fish from Indonesian fish markets contained plastic debris or synthetic fibers. This was one of the first times plastic debris were reported in fish sold directly for human consumption.

Another study Williams performed in collaboration with Indonesian scientists looked into ways to restore seagrass beds, endangered habitats that are important for, among other things, supporting fisheries and protecting coastlines. Working in Indonesia's Coral Triangle, a biodiversity hotspot made up of seagrass, coral reefs, and mangrove forests, Williams and her colleagues showed that restoration efforts were more effective when they planted multiple species of seagrass instead of just a single species. These findings can help direct seagrass restoration efforts around the world.

In October 2017 and February 2018, Williams returned to Indonesia through the Fulbright Specialist Program; there she worked with faculty and students at Hasanuddin University to establish and expand upon existing infrastructure to protect Indonesia's coastal ecosystems.

== Advocacy and community outreach ==
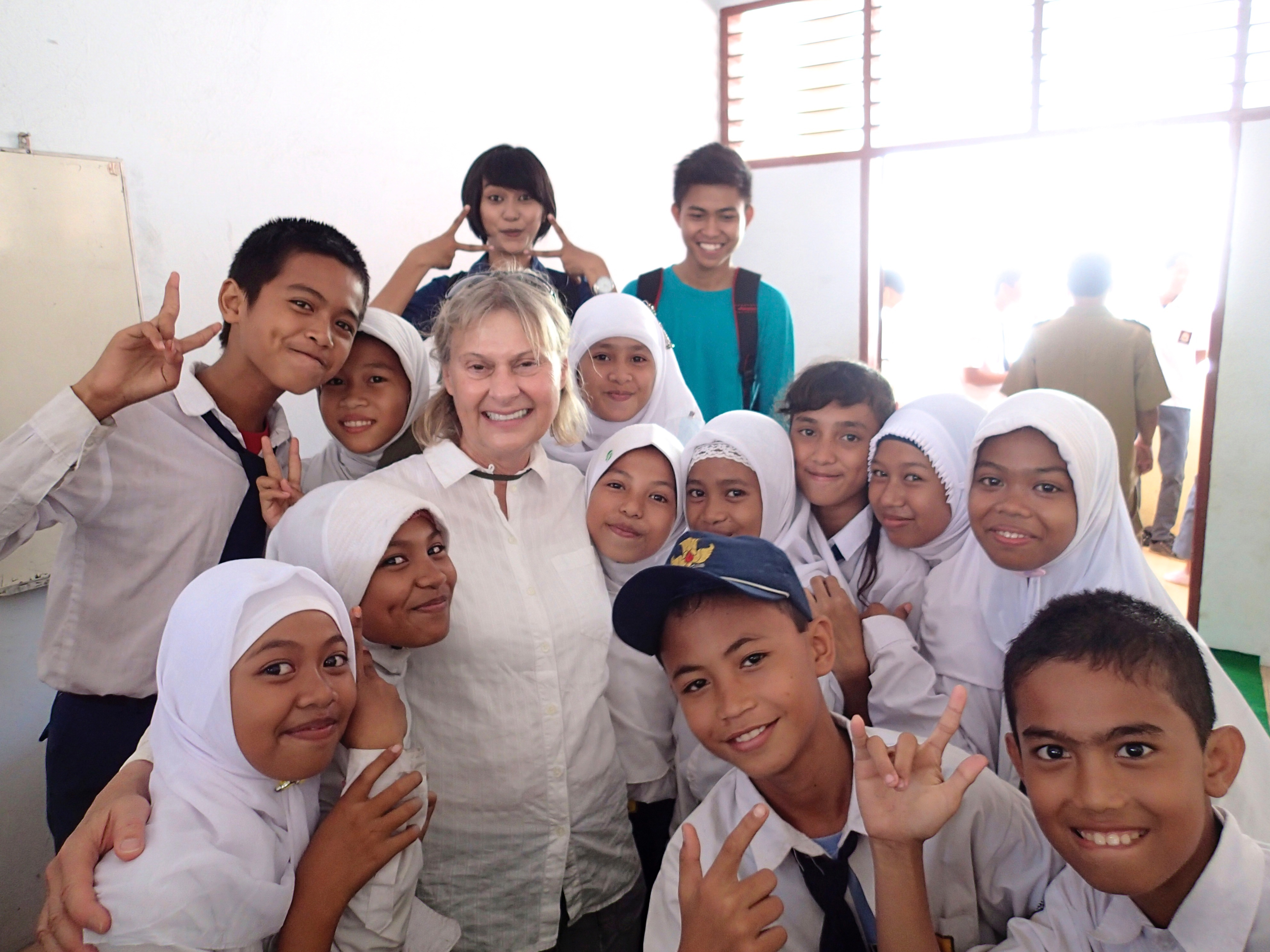
Outreach in the Spermonde Islands

Williams encouraged scientists to engage meaningfully with the general public as well as with politicians. Her connection with political activism began early in her scientific career; in 1993, she was appointed to a panel of scientists consulting with the assistant secretary of the Interior, and in 2000 she received an Aldo Leopold Fellowship in Environmental Leadership. This activism continued to the end; mere weeks before her death she co-wrote an article commemorating the one-year anniversary of 2017's March for Science in which she urged scientists to become more engaged with the public and politicians.

In 2007, she testified before United States Congressional committees about how the Point Arena upwelling center off California's coast provides nutrients to help downstream marine productivity - this is credited with helping pass legislation in June 2015 extending the northern boundary of California's Greater Farallones National Marine Sanctuary in order to better protect the coastal environment.

Williams also used her scientific work to speak out about the dangers of climate change; in 2010, she helped raise the alarm that even small increases in ocean temperature could rapidly accelerate the growth of invasive species in marine environments.

Williams was remembered by colleagues as an effective mentor and strong advocate for women scientists. In 2009, UC Davis' Consortium for Women and Research named her an "outstanding mentor."

== Awards ==
- Fellow of the California Academy of Sciences, 2003
- Fellow of the American Association for the Advancement of Science, 2006
- Distinguished Scholarly Public Service Award, UC Davis Academic Senate, 2010
- Outstanding Mentor Award, UC Davis Consortium for Women and Research, 2009
- Outstanding Student in Oceanography, University of Alaska, 1977
- Outstanding Biology Faculty Member, San Diego State University, 1993
- Aldo Leopold Fellowship in Environmental Leadership, 2000
- Distinguished Service Award, Coastal and Estuarine Research Federation, 2013
- Outstanding Leadership Honor, Coastal and Estuarine Research Federation, 2011
- Fellow of the Japan Society for the Promotion of Science, 1997

== Selected publications ==
- Williams, Susan L.; Ambo-Rappe, Rohani; Sur, Christine; Abbott, Jessica M.; Limbong, Steven R. (2017-11-07). "Species richness accelerates marine ecosystem restoration in the Coral Triangle". Proceedings of the National Academy of Sciences. 114 (45): 11986–11991. Bibcode:2017PNAS..11411986W. doi:10.1073/pnas.1707962114. PMC 5692552. PMID 29078320.
- Rochman, Chelsea M.; Tahir, Akbar; Williams, Susan L.; Baxa, Dolores V.; Lam, Rosalyn; Miller, Jeffrey T.; Teh, Foo-Ching; Werorilangi, Shinta; Teh, Swee J. (2015-09-24). "Anthropogenic debris in seafood: Plastic debris and fibers from textiles in fish and bivalves sold for human consumption". Scientific Reports. 5 (1) 14340. Bibcode:2015NatSR...514340R. doi:10.1038/srep14340. ISSN 2045-2322. PMC 4585829. PMID 26399762.]
- Williams, Susan L (June 2013). "A new collaboration for Indonesia's small islands". Frontiers in Ecology and the Environment. 11 (5): 274–275. Bibcode:2013FrEE...11..274W. doi:10.1890/1540-9295-11.5.274. ISSN 1540-9295. S2CID 43912260.
