= Chelsea Rochman =

American marine and freshwater ecologist

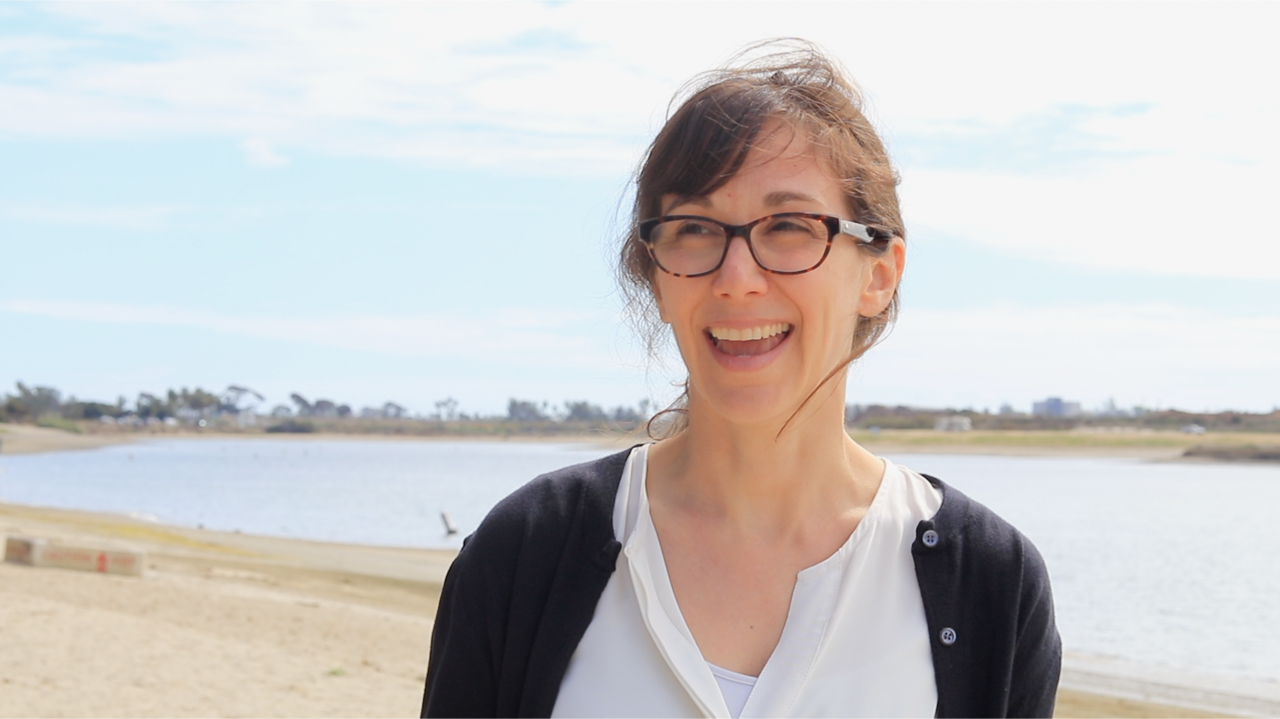
- Born: November 26, 1981 (age 44); Tucson, Arizona, United States
- Education: University of California, San Diego (B.Sc., 2007); University of California, Davis and San Diego State University (Ph.D., 2013)
- Scientific career
- Fields: Marine ecology; Freshwater ecology; Ecotoxicology; Environmental chemistry; Conservation Science
- Workplaces: University of Toronto (since 2016)
- Thesis: Plastic and Priority Pollutants: A Multiple Stressor in Aquatic Habitats (2013)
- Doctoral advisors: Eunha Hoh, Brian Hentschel, Swee Teh
- Website: http://www.rochmanlab.com

Chelsea Marina Rochman is an American marine and freshwater ecologist whose research focuses on anthropogenic stressors (primarily plastic pollution) in freshwater and marine ecosystems. Since September 2016, Rochman has been an assistant professor at the University of Toronto in the department of Ecology and Evolutionary Biology and a scientific advisor to the Ocean Conservancy.

She is currently spearheading a large scale study on the fate and effects of microplastics at the Experimental Lakes Area. The project is entitled pELAstic.

== Education ==
Rochman received a Bachelor of Science from the University of California, San Diego in Ecology, Behaviour, and Evolutionary Biology in December 2007. In May 2013, under the supervision of Eunha Hoh, Brian Hentschel, and Swee Teh, she received her PhD at the University of California, Davis and San Diego State University in Marine Ecology. Her dissertation focused on assessing the fate and effects of plastic and chemical pollutants in marine ecosystems.

== Career ==
From June 2013 to August 2014, Rochman was a Postdoctoral Scholar in the Aquatic Health Program at the UC Davis School of Veterinary Medicine while under the supervision of Swee Teh. Following that period, from September 2014 to September 2016, she was a David. H. Smith Postdoctoral Fellow based at the University of California, Davis and the University of Toronto under the supervision of Swee Teh, Susan Williams, and Miriam Diamond. Finally, Rochman was simultaneously hired as an assistant professor at the University of Toronto's Department of Ecology and Evolutionary Biology and contracted by the Ocean Conservancy as a Scientific Advisor in September 2016.

She serves as a referee for multiple journals, including the Proceedings of the Royal Society B, Nature Ecology and Evolution, Environmental Chemistry, and she serves as an editorial board member for Science of the Total Environment.

She is a member of multiple societies including the Association for the Sciences of Limnology and Oceanography, the Society for Conservation Biology, and the Society of Environmental Toxicology and Chemistry.

== Outreach ==
Rochman's research has been featured regularly in news outlets, including the Canadian Broadcasting Corporation, The New York Times, Scientific American, and National Geographic. She regularly works with government and industry to inform science-based policy (e.g., California Bill AB888, US Microbead-free Waters Act, Canada G7 ocean plastics charter), and most recently, she provided testimony to the U.S. House of Representatives in Washington, D.C., on the topic of "Marine Debris: Impacts on Ecosystems and Species".

At the University of Toronto, Rochman co-founded the University of Toronto Trash Team (U of T Trash Team). They collaborate with local, national, and international stakeholders and members of the general public to promote general waste literacy and optimal waste reduction strategies. They are currently involved in projects which aim to divert the flow of microfibers into the Great Lakes, reduce plastic pellet emissions into Mimico Creek, and in collaboration with PortsToronto, explore the utility and efficiency of Seabins (floating trash interceptors) in the Toronto harbour. One of their most recent public outreach initiatives is the "Urban Litter Challenge". The U of T Trash Team, in concert with members of the general public, document and collect all trash found within multiple regions of the Greater Toronto Area.

== Research contributions ==
Rochman's research investigates the sources, fate, and effects of plastic pollution and associated chemicals, to inform solutions to this growing environmental issue. Her research program also works on developing novel methods for quantifying and characterizing microplastics in the environment.

Rochman's early research tested hypotheses pertaining to how chemicals sorb to and from microplastics, and whether microplastics act as vectors for contaminants to marine and freshwater organisms. In addition, she used laboratory experiments to quantify the effects of microplastics on fish and invertebrate health.

Currently, Rochman's research group focuses on the sources and pathways of microplastics and other contaminants into urban watersheds and Arctic ecosystems, the effects of multiple stressors on ecosystems across all levels of biological organization, and solutions to reduce plastics pollution.

== See also ==
- Human impact on marine life
- Plastic soup
- Garbage patch
- Forever chemicals
