= Lee Strasberg Theatre and Film Institute =

Acting school in New York

Coordinates: 40°44′6.5″N 73°59′19.5″W

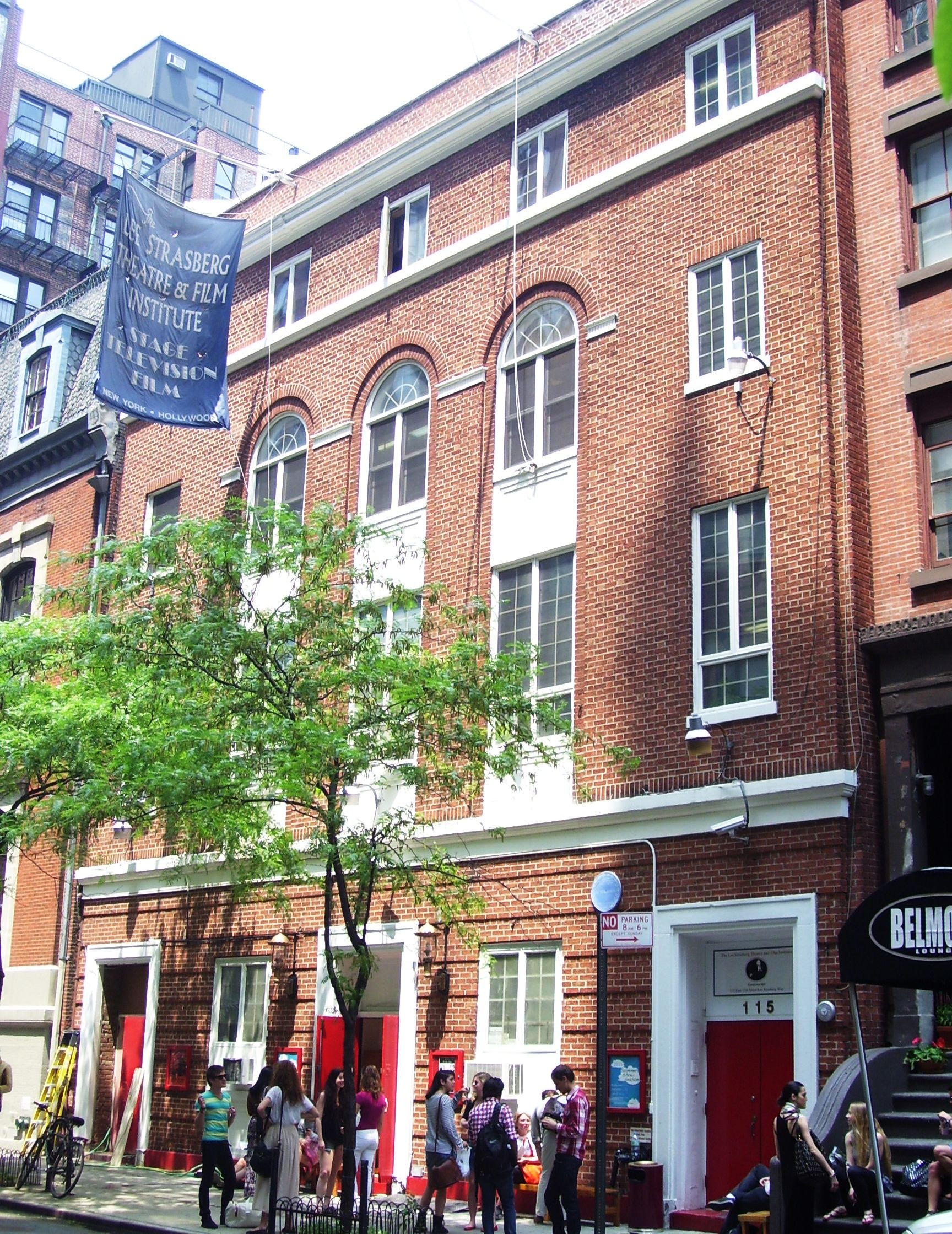
- Lee Strasberg Institute in 2011
- Formation: 1969
- Type: Drama school
- Headquarters: New York City
- Region served: United States
- Website: strasberg.edu

The Lee Strasberg Theatre & Film Institute (originally the Lee Strasberg Theatre Institute) is an acting school founded in 1969 by the actor, director, and acting teacher Lee Strasberg. The Institute is located in Union Square on East 15th Street, also known as Lee Strasberg Way, in New York City. The school has a secondary campus in Los Angeles.

For more than 40 years, the Institute has partnered with New York University's Tisch School of the Arts, where students can earn a Bachelor of Fine Arts degree. The Los Angeles campus also offers an Associate of Occupational Studies degree. Until her January 2024 death, the Institute was under the artistic direction of Anna Strasberg, Lee Strasberg's widow. Students at the Lee Strasberg Theatre & Film Institute learn method acting, an acting technique created and developed by Strasberg.

== History ==
In 1931, Lee Strasberg co-founded the Group Theatre, hailed as "America's first true theatrical collective," alongside fellow directors Harold Clurman and Cheryl Crawford. In 1951, he became director of the Actors Studio in New York City, considered "the nation's most prestigious acting school", and, in 1966, he was involved in the foundation of the Actors Studio West in Los Angeles.

After almost five decades of teaching private classes and shepherding generations of actors toward success at the Actors Studio, Strasberg established his own school in 1969, open to all those interested in learning The Method. Years later, a gift from his wife Anna Strasberg established the permanent homes of the Lee Strasberg Theatre & Film Institutes in both New York and Los Angeles.

=== Anna Strasberg ===
Anna Strasberg
- Born: Anna Mizrahi; April 16, 1939; Caracas, Venezuela
- Died: January 6, 2024 (aged 84); New York, U.S.
- Occupation: Actress

Anna Strasberg (April 16, 1939 – January 6, 2024), also known as Anna Mizrahi, was a Venezuelan-born American actress and artistic director of the institute. In 1968, she married Lee Strasberg. Thanks to the will of Marilyn Monroe, of whom her predecessor Paula Strasberg was an acting coach together with her husband Lee, she inherited after Lee's death and took take care of the Marilyn Monroe Theater and the Marilyn Monroe Museum (at first it was a room of the Lee Strasberg Theater and Film Institute, which he personally curated). She had among her students Michel Altieri. Strasberg acted in some cinema and television films in the 1960s, and again in the 1980s. She died in New York on January 6, 2024, at the age of 84.

==== Film roles ====
- Extraña invasión, 1965
- Riot on Sunset Strip, 1967
- Winter of the Witch, 1969
- Aurora, 1984
- The Fortunate Pilgrim, 1988

== Notable alumni ==
- Matt Adler
- Akhil Akkineni
- Khalilah Ali
- Karen Allen
- Nancy Allen
- Antero Alli
- Greg Anderson
- Vito Antuofermo
- Will Arnett
- Srinivas Avasarala
- Blanche Baker
- Adam Bakri
- Alec Baldwin
- Talia Balsam
- Rik Barnett
- Alma Beltran
- Elizabeth Berridge
- Dean Biasucci
- Chaz Bono
- Josh Bowman
- Cyrus Broacha
- Rachel Brosnahan
- Jim J. Bullock
- Steve Buscemi
- Rosanne Cash
- Kiera Chaplin
- Kevin Corrigan
- Miguel Coyula
- Luciano Cruz-Coke
- Ben Curtis
- Kelly Curtis
- Tony Dalton
- Claire Danes
- Rosario Dawson
- Rebecca De Mornay
- Laura Dern
- Kim Dickens
- Brenda Dickson
- Matt Dillon
- Cary Elwes
- Jennifer Esposito
- Chris Evans
- Bridget Fonda
- Peter Førde
- Jorja Fox
- Benno Fürmann
- Teri Garr
- Edith González
- Eiza González
- Eric Gores
- Carson Grant
- Peter Greene
- Kathy Griffin
- Sachin Gupta
- Gilda Haddock
- Linda Hamilton
- Brianne Howey
- Jay Huguley
- Michael Imperioli
- Lorenza Izzo
- Oliver Jackson-Cohen
- Scarlett Johansson
- Amy Jo Johnson
- Angelina Jolie
- Ranbir Kapoor
- Janhvi Kapoor
- Janice Karman
- Carmen Kass
- Lainie Kazan
- Johnny Kemp
- Brian Kerwin
- Dhruv Vikram
- Jiah Khan
- Rahul Khanna
- Callie Khouri
- Prakash Kovelamudi
- Lady Gaga
- Inbar Lavi
- Eriberto Leão
- Brandon Lee
- John Leguizamo
- Jennifer Jason Leigh
- Chelsea Leyland
- Sean Li
- Sophia Lillis
- Traci Lords
- Susan Loughnane
- Amy Madigan
- Jean-Baptiste Maunier
- Danica McKellar
- William McNamara
- Sienna Miller
- Donna Murphy
- Jason Narvy
- Gianella Neyra
- Valerie Niehaus
- Kelli O'Hara
- Jerry Orbach
- Ori Pfeffer
- Linh Dan Pham
- Anne Pitoniak
- Franka Potente
- Tyrone Power Jr.
- Linda Purl
- Juan Ricondo
- Yaniv Rokah
- Roger Rose
- Daniela Ruah
- Theresa Russell
- Davy Sardou
- Tom Schilling
- Michael Schoeffling
- Omar Sharif Jr.
- Hilary Shepard
- Lewis Smith
- Renée Felice Smith
- Bonnie Somerville
- Sissy Spacek
- Fabian Stumm
- Miles Teller
- Marlo Thomas
- Gianfranco Terrin
- Uma Thurman
- Rip Torn
- Shenaz Treasurywala
- Tom Villard
- Christoph Waltz
- Tim Williams
- Chandra Wilson
- Marie Windsor
- Michael Wright
- Mari Yamamoto

== See also ==
- Actors Studio
- Group Theatre
- Stanislavski's system
