= An American Affair (EP) =

EP by Juan Ricondo
- Released: 27 December 2015
- Genre: Pop, American music
- Length: 11:50
- Language: Spanish, English
- Label: American Affair Music
- Producer: Sean Hamilton, JD Salbego and Juan Ricondo

Juan Ricondo chronology
An American Affair (2015)	Háblame (2017)

Singles from An American Affair
- 1. "Solo Pienso en Ti" Released: 15 April 2016

An American Affair is the debut extended play (EP) by Spanish singer and songwriter Juan Ricondo, with production and arrangements by Sean Hamilton, JD Salbego and Juan Ricondo. It was released on 27 December 2015. The lead single, titled "Solo Pienso en Ti", was released on 15 April 2016.

The EP includes four tracks and has been dubbed as a pop record. It was made available for digital download, CD and Vinyl record. To promote the EP, Ricondo released an official music video for the recording "Solo Pienso en Ti". All of the material on the EP was composed by Ricondo.

== Track listing ==
All tracks are written by Juan Ricondo. Produced by Sean Hamilton, JD Salbego and Juan Ricondo

No.	Title	Length
1.	"We're not that different at all"	2:37
2.	"Solo pienso en ti"	2:49
3.	"Losing You"	3:16
4.	"Such a fool with your heart"	3:48
