= Nyumbani Orphanage =

- Established: 1992; 34 years ago
- Affiliations: Jesuit, Catholic
- Website: www.nyumbani.org

The Nyumbani Children's Home was founded by Father Angelo D'Agostino and Sister Mary Owens in 1992 to serve mostly abandoned children created by the AIDS pandemic. Since then, three more programs (Nyumbani Village, Lea Toto and Nyumbani Diagnostic Laboratory) have been added to the organization.

== Background ==
Originally a medical doctor in the US Air Force, D'Agostino joined the Jesuits early in his career, focused on psychiatry, and held various teaching positions. But it was through his experience working with Jesuit charities that D'Agostino learned of the need for specialized facilities for abandoned children in Nairobi, Kenya. Today over 100 orphans or abandoned children live at Nyumbani Children's Home located in Karen, Nairobi.

In 1998, the recognition that there was a need to expand the basic initiative of Nyumbani Home to other locales led to the Lea Toto program. This is "a community-based outreach program providing services to HIV+ children and their families in the Kangemi, Waithaka, Kawangware, Riruta, Mutuini, Ruthimitu, Kibera and Kariobangi communities of Nairobi, Kenya." Nyumbani's Lea Toto HIV/AIDS program operates eight centers and serves between 2,100 and 3,100 HIV-positive children and up to 15,000 family members every year.

In 2006, Nyumbani Village, which cares for over 1,000 children and 100 elderly grandparents, was established on 1,000 acres in Kitui County, Kenya.

The Nyumbani programs are supported by international boards in the United States, United Kingdom, Ireland, Spain, Italy and Kenya.

== Nyumbani Village ==
Based on past success, a related effort called Nyumbani Village was spawned to support both orphans and elders impacted by the AIDS pandemic. Located on 1,000 acres (4.0 km^{2}) donated by the Kitui District County Council, Nyumbani Village is conceived to support between 1280 and 1600 individuals via a self-sustaining agricultural based venture. Shortly after its inauguration, on 20 November 2006, Fr. D'Ag died. But with his organizational skills, this new venture also continued to prosper. In 2016 it had 120 employees tending to 100 elderly grandparents and 1000 children. In September 2016, actress Danai Gurira presented a video about the village and the work being done in Africa as part of the 2016 Global Citizen Festival in New York City and BBC has covered its learning curve in the use of drugs. The pharmaceuticals company Johnson & Johnson is a sponsoring partner via Global Citizen, in an outreach effort to promote social action and awareness.
