= Chelsea Jackson Roberts =

American yoga instructor

- Born: Dayton, Ohio, U.S.
- Occupations: Fitness instructor Educator
- Years active: 2013-present
- Known for: Yoga, Literature, and Art Camp at Spelman College Museum of Fine Art

Chelsea Jackson Roberts is a fitness coach and Peloton instructor who specializes in yoga and meditation. She was Lululemon's first African-American global ambassador.

== Early life ==
Jackson Roberts graduated from Trotwood High School in Dayton, Ohio. She then attended Spelman College in Atlanta, Georgia, from which she graduated with a degree in child development. Later, Jackson Roberts obtained her MA in International Education from Teachers College, Columbia University and PhD from Emory University.

== Education career ==
After college, Jackson Roberts worked as an elementary school teacher in Atlanta, Georgia. She became a certified yoga instructor and began integrating yoga into her classroom teaching. She founded Yoga, Literature, and Art Camp at Spelman College Museum of Fine Art in 2013 to help bring yoga to young women and Red Clay Yoga in 2015 to help diversify the practice of yoga.

Jackson Roberts joined Peloton interactive as a yoga and meditation instructor in May 2020. With fellow instructor, Tunde Oyeneyin, Jackson Roberts co-leads Peloton's "Breathe In, Speak Up”, their anti-racism initiative launched in June 2020.

== Personal life ==
In 2015 Chelsea Jackson Roberts married Shane Roberts who is also the co-founder of Red Clay Yoga. They have one child, a son born in 2022.
