= Chelsea Makela =

American actress

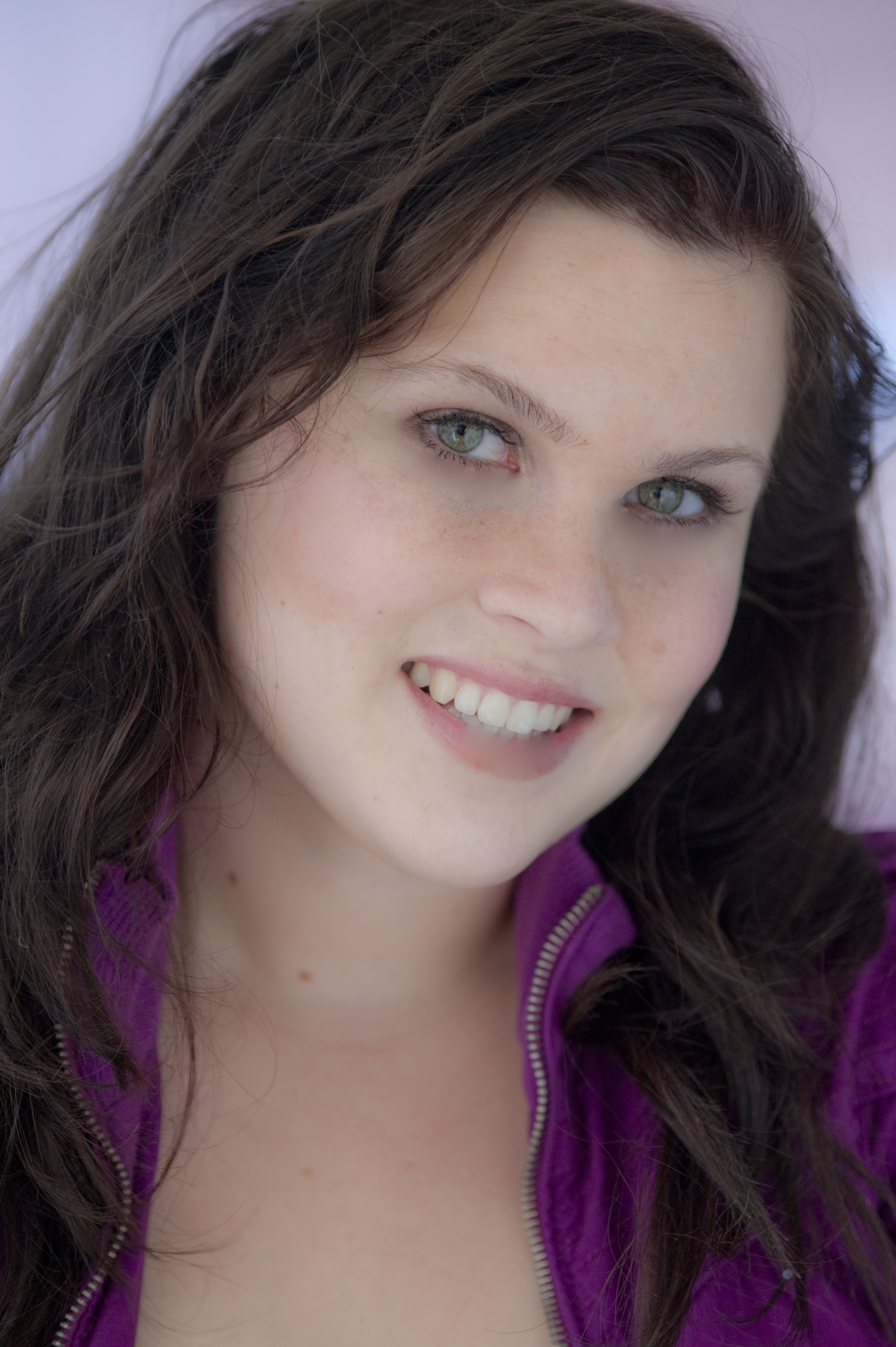
- Born: January 16, 1990 (age 36); Brentwood, California
- Occupations: Actress, writer
- Works: Dance Flick

Chelsea Lynn Makela (born January 16, 1990, Brentwood, California), better known as Chelsea Makela, is an American actress, writer and designer. Makela has been performing since she was in middle school; one of her biggest accomplishments at this time, was singing at Carnegie Hall in New York City at the age of 14. Makela's first movie role was the lead role Tracy Transfat in Dance Flick, a film released by Paramount Pictures in 2009. She has also appeared in several television shows and films since then.
