= Chelsea Curtis Fraser =

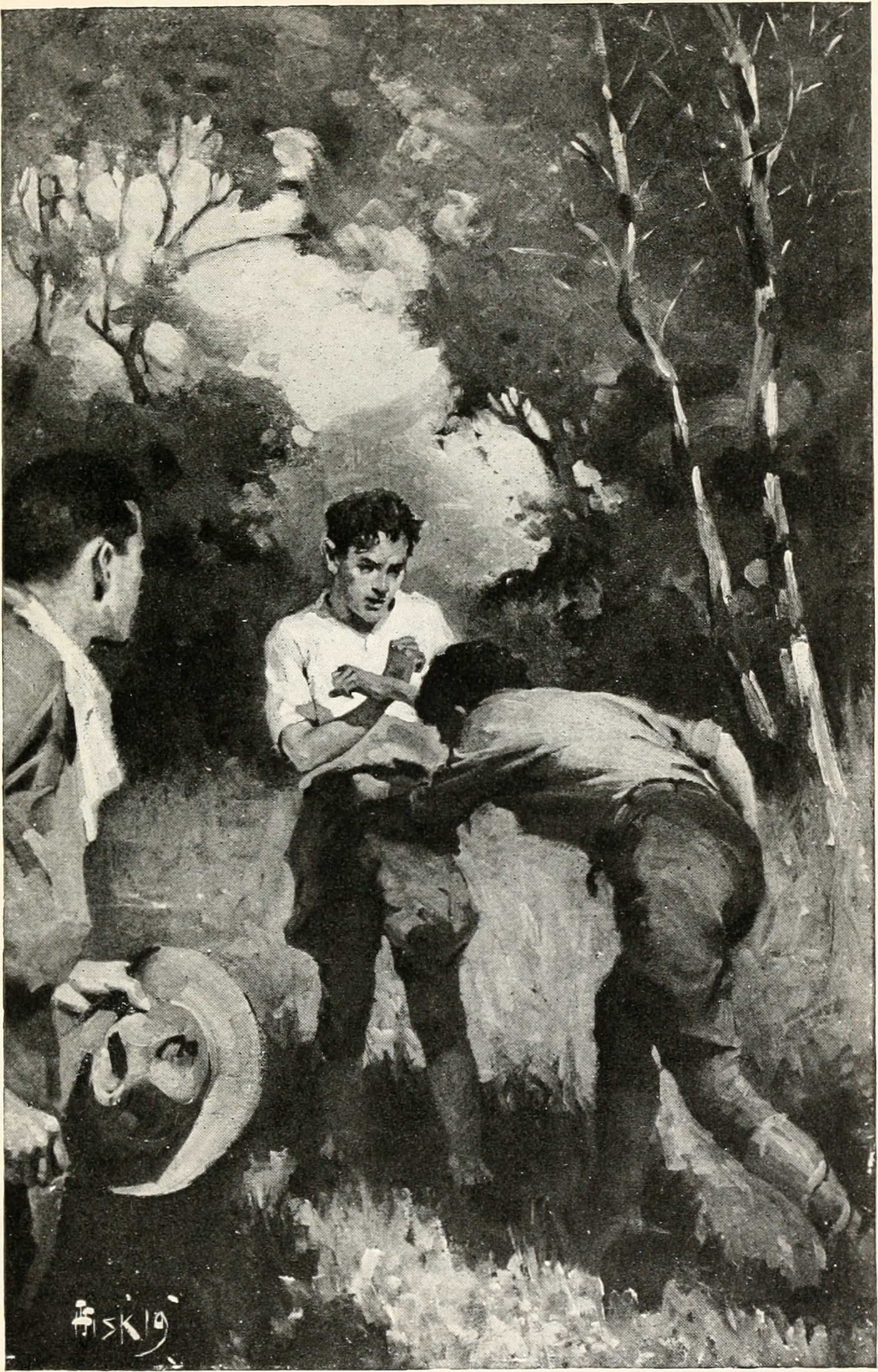
- An illustration from The Boy Hikers; or, Doing Their Bit for Uncle Sam by Chelsea Curtis Fraser, 1918. Fraser created most of the illustrations for his books.
- Born: August 28, 1876; New Sarum, Ontario, Canada
- Died: November 7, 1954 (aged 78); Saginaw, Michigan, U.S.

Chelsea Curtis Fraser (August 28, 1876 – November 7, 1954) was a Canadian-born American high school industrial arts teacher, prolific author of non-fiction books for children and visual artist from Saginaw, Michigan.

He was born in New Sarum, Ontario, Canada, to Oliver L. Fraser and Emma Atherton Fraser. His family later moved to the United States and resided in Saginaw, Michigan, where he graduated from high school. He later attended Michigan State College in East Lansing, Michigan, and the University of Chicago in Chicago, Illinois. At different points in his career, he worked as a messenger for the Western Union Telegraph Company in 1892; as a musical instruments inlayer from 1893 to 1899, for Montgomery Ward & Company from 1900 to 1902, as a mandolin and guitar maker in Kalamazoo, Michigan, from 1904 to 1905, in advertising for the Saginaw Milling Company from 1906 to 1907, as a furniture inspector for the War Department from 1909 to 1911, and as an industrial arts instructor for the Grand Rapids, Michigan school district from 1913 to 1931. He published 23 nonfiction books for children and several nonfiction magazine articles between 1911 and 1950. He created many of the illustrations for his books and articles. He never married and had no children. He died on November 7, 1954, in Saginaw, Michigan.

== Works ==
- Good Old Chums or Helping the Other Fellow (1911), New York: A.L. Chatterton
- Every Boy's Book of Handicraft, Sports and Amusements: Worthwhile Plans for the General Activities of the Modern Boy, Be He Handy or Unhandy (1913), Boston: The Page Company
- The Boy Hikers; or, Doing Their Bit for Uncle Sam (1918), New York: Thomas Y. Crowell
- Articles in The Detroit Free Press, Furniture Artisan, Furniture Manufacturer, American Boy, Youth's Companion, Popular Mechanics, and Popular Science (1918)
- Boy's Book of Battles; The Story of Eleven Famous Land Combats (1919), New York: Thomas Y. Crowell
- Boy's Book of Sea Fights; Famous Naval Engagements from Drake to Beatty (1920), Cleveland, OH : World Publishing
- Young Citizen's Own Book (1920), New York: Thomas Y. Crowel
- Work-A-Day Heroes (1921), New York: Thomas Y. Crowell
- Secrets of the Earth (1921), New York: Thomas Y. Crowell
- The Story of John Paul Jones (1922), New York: Barse & Hopkins
- Around the World in 10 Days (1922), New York: Thomas Y. Crowell
- Heroes of the Wild (1923), New York: Thomas Y. Crowell
- Heroes of the Sea (1924), New York: Thomas Y. Crowell
- The Practical Book of Home Repairs (1925), New York: Thomas Y. Crowell
- Heroes of the Air (1926), New York: Thomas Y. Crowell
- Boy's Busy Book (1927), New York: Thomas Y. Crowell
- The Story of Engineering in America (1928), New York: Thomas Y. Crowell
- Heroes of the Farthest North and Farthest South (1930), New York: Thomas Y. Crowell
- Model Aircraft Builder (1931), New York: Thomas Y. Crowell
- Practical Violin Making (1933), Saginaw, MI: Self?
- The Story of Aircraft (1933–39), New York: Thomas Y. Crowell
- Famous American Flyers (1941), New York: Thomas Y. Crowell
- Heroes of the Air (1946), New York: Thomas Y. Crowell
- Boy's Book of Sea Battles (1950), Cleveland, OH : World Publishing
