= Chelsea Marriner =

New Zealand dog handler and trainer

Chelsea Marriner is a dog handler and trainer from New Zealand.

Marriner was born and raised in Rotorua, in the North Island of New Zealand. When she was 7 she started competing in agility events and at 10 was a winner in the SPCA Animal Ark Young Animal Carer of the Year.

In May 2010, aged 18, she represented New Zealand at the World Agility Championships in Britain, winning a gold medal in the individual jumping event with a dog borrowed from a local owner. In 2018 she was selected for the Paw Blacks team to represent New Zealand at the Australian Agility Nationals in Melbourne, Australia.

Marriner also performs with her team of dogs at public events in New Zealand, such as the National Agricultural Fieldays and A & P Shows. In 2008 and 2012 she performed with her dogs on New Zealand's Got Talent, progressing to the grand final in 2008 and the semi-final in 2012.
