= Chelsea Martin =

American author and illustrator (born 1986)

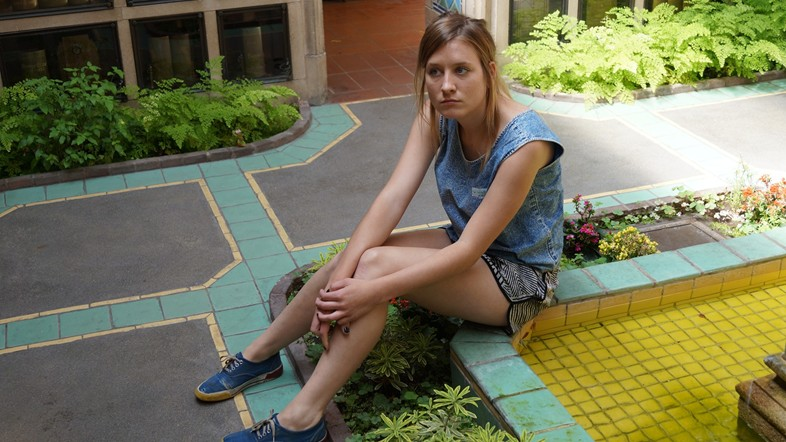
- Chelsea Martin, 2013
- Born: July 16, 1986 (age 40); Santa Rosa, California
- Education: California College of the Arts (BFA)
- Occupations: Author, artist
- Writing career
- Genre: Alt lit
- Notable work: Even Though I Don't Miss You
- Website: jerkethics.com

Chelsea Martin (born July 16, 1986) is an American author and illustrator.

== Early life ==
She received a BFA from California College of the Arts in 2008.

== Career ==
She is the author of Everything Was Fine Until Whatever (Future Tense Books, 2009), The Really Funny Thing About Apathy (Sunnyoutside, 2010), Kramer Sutra (Universal Error, 2012), and Even Though I Don't Miss You (Short Flight/Long Drive Books, 2013), which was named one of the Best Indie Books of 2013 by Dazed Magazine and was a small press bestseller. Her work has also appeared in numerous journals including Poetry Foundation, Hobart (magazine), Lena Dunham's newsletter Lenny Letter Vice' and the Alt lit Anthology '’40 Likely To Die Before 40.'’

Her work has been described as "emotionally honest", "provocative and disturbing", and, "less disaffected than the Alt lit peers she's associated with." Her work has often been compared to that of Harmony Korine.

Nylon Magazine said her work "feels like a meditation on consciousness, feeling, and of course, the absence of both," and Publishers Weekly called The Really Funny Thing About Apathy "a fixation on fleeting incidents in the life of the young and fearful."

== Works and publications ==
- Everything Was Fine Until Whatever (Future Tense Books, 2009) ISBN 978-1892061355
- The Really Funny Thing About Apathy (Sunnyoutside Press, 2010) ISBN 978-1934513248
- Even Though I Don't Miss You (Short Flight/Long Drive Books, 2013) ISBN 978-0989695008
- Mickey (Curbside Splendor, 2016) ISBN 978-1940430737
- Caca Dolce (Soft Skull Press, 2017) ISBN 978-1593766771
- Tell Me I’m an Artist (Soft Skull Press, 2022) ISBN 978-1593767211

== Other work ==
Martin is a comic artist. Her comic Heavy-Handed was published bi-weekly on The Rumpus in 2012 and 2013. She is also the illustrator of the book of poetry Four-Letter Poems by Joshua Brandon (Universal Error, 2011).

In 2010, Martin founded the art collective Universal Error, where she is currently Creative Director.

Martin has self-published several chapbooks and comic books, and is a proponent of self-publishing.
