= Chelsea Lewis =

Chelsea Lewis may refer to:

- Chelsea Lewis (netball) (born 1993), Welsh netball player
- Chelsea Lewis (South of Nowhere), fictional character in the TV show South of Nowhere
