= Murders of Rick and Suzanna Wamsley =

2003 murder case in Texas

Rick and Suzanna Wamsley were murdered on December 11, 2003 in their home in Mansfield, Texas, as part of a conspiracy involving their son Andrew and two others.

== Crime ==
On the evening of December 11, 2003, Rick and Suzanna Wamsley, an upper-class Mansfield, Texas couple, were shot and stabbed to death in their home by Andrew Wamsley's friend Susana Toledano. The murders were part of a scheme orchestrated by Andrew Wamsley, his girlfriend Chelsea Richardson, and their friend Toledano to collect the Wamsleys' $1.65 million estate. The three conspirators also wanted to kill Andrew's older sister Sarah, but she was not home on the night of the murders.

== Conspirators ==
=== Andrew Wamsley ===
Andrew Wamsley (born July 30, 1984) was the second child born to Rick and Suzanna Wamsley. He began dating Chelsea Richardson in January 2003. Andrew's parents reportedly disapproved of their son's relationship with Chelsea.

=== Chelsea Richardson ===
Chelsea Lea Richardson (born March 26, 1984) grew up in a working-class neighborhood of Tarrant County, Texas, in contrast to her boyfriend Andrew Wamsley. She and Andrew started conspiring to kill Andrew's parents in October 2003. She was also roommates with Susana Toledano at the time of the murder.

=== Susana Toledano ===
Susana Alejandra Toledano (born September 28, 1984) was Chelsea Richardson's roommate. Susana was reportedly forced by her co-defendants to shoot and stab Rick and Suzanna Wamsley on the night of December 11, 2003. She had also been made to shoot at the gas tank of the Wamsleys' Jeep Laredo during a failed murder attempt that occurred on November 9, 2003.

=== Hilario Cardenas ===
Hilario Cardenas was an IHOP restaurant manager in Arlington, Texas who conspired with the three other co-defendants on how to murder the Wamsleys. He provided the gun that was used in the murders.

== Convictions ==
In order to avoid the death penalty, Susana Toledano pleaded guilty to the murder in January 2005, as part of a plea in which she turned state's evidence. On May 26, 2006, she was sentenced to life in prison with the possibility of parole after 30 years. As part of her plea deal she testified against Chelsea and Andrew at their subsequent trials. Susana will be eligible for parole in 2034.

Chelsea Richardson's trial began in May 2005. Chelsea's fellow prison inmates testified at her trial that she had admitted her role in the murders. Susana Toledano also testified that Chelsea told her to kill the Wamsleys so they could share in the family's estate. After three hours of deliberation Chelsea was convicted of capital murder. The jury deliberated for just over two hours before unanimously sentencing Chelsea to be executed by lethal injection. The jury cited the crime's brutal and premeditated nature, and the fact that she was considered a "danger to society." She became the first female sentenced to death in Tarrant County, Texas, later followed by Lisa Coleman. On December 13, 2011, Chelsea's sentence was commuted to life in prison.

Andrew Wamsley was convicted of capital murder on March 5, 2006. Jurors did not view Andrew as a future danger to society and sentenced him to life in prison. His conviction and life sentence were affirmed by the Second District of Texas Courts of Appeals on March 13, 2008. Andrew is serving his sentence at the John B. Connally Unit in Kenedy, Texas. Barring a successful appeal, Andrew will be eligible for parole in 2044.

Hilario Cardenas pleaded guilty to conspiracy to murder. On May 26, 2006 he received a 50-year sentence with parole eligibility in 2014. Cardenas was denied parole in June 2016 and again in June 2017.
