= Chelsea Pinnix =

American oncologist

Chelsea Camille Pinnix
- Education: University of Maryland, Baltimore County; University of Pennsylvania
- Scientific career
- Workplaces: MD Anderson Cancer Center
- Thesis: Notch1 activation confers transforming properties to primary human melanocytes and promotes human melanoma progression (2006)

Chelsea Camille Pinnix is an American oncologist who is an Associate Professor of Radiation Oncology and Director of the Residency Program at the MD Anderson Cancer Center (MDACC). Having joined the faculty 2012, her research looks to improve the outcomes of patients who suffer from lymphoma.

Pinnix attended the University of Maryland, Baltimore County for her undergraduate degree, where she studied biochemistry. She was a member of the Meyerhoff Scholarship Program. She moved to the University of Pennsylvania for her medical degree, and completed an MD-PhD in 2007. She was awarded a National Institutes of Health Medical Science Scholarship and the NIH Ruth L. Kirschstein National Research Service Award. In 2010 she was supported by the UNCF to complete postdoctoral research at the MDACC.

== Selected publications ==
- Chelsea C Pinnix; John T Lee; Zhao-Jun Liu; et al. (23 June 2009). "Active Notch1 confers a transformed phenotype to primary human melanocytes". Cancer Research. 69 (13): 5312–5320. doi:10.1158/0008-5472.can-08-3767. ISSN 0008-5472. PMC 2755513. PMID 19549918. Wikidata Q37371156.
- Chelsea Pinnix; Bouthaina S Dabaja; Sarah A Milgrom; et al. (21 February 2018). "Ultra-low-dose radiotherapy for definitive management of ocular adnexal B-cell lymphoma". Head & Neck. 40 (6): 1335. doi:10.1002/hed.25149. ISSN 1043-3074. PMID 29851218. Wikidata Q88931515.
- Zhao-Jun Liu; Min Xiao; Klara Balint; Akinobu Soma; Chelsea Pinnix; Anthony J Capobianco; Omaida C Velazquez; Meenhard Herlyn (29 March 2006). "Inhibition of endothelial cell proliferation by Notch1 signaling is mediated by repressing MAPK and PI3K/Akt pathways and requires MAML1". The FASEB Journal. 20 (7): 1009–1011. doi:10.1096/fj.05-4880fje. ISSN 0892-6638. PMID 16571776. Wikidata Q83005184.
