= Chelsey Johnson =

American author and professor

- Born: Minnesota, U.S.
- Education: Iowa Writers' Workshop (MFA)
- Occupations: Author; former professor
- Website: www.chelseyjohnson.com

Chelsey Johnson is an American author and former professor, known for her 2018 debut novel Stray City.

Johnson lived in Portland from 2002 to 2009; the book was released with its own online mixtape.

Johnson was an associate professor of fiction and coordinated the creative writing program at Northern Arizona University. Prior to coming to NAU, she taught at the College of William & Mary and at Oberlin College.

Johnson was born in Northern Minnesota. She received an MFA from the Iowa Writers' Workshop. She has written for Ploughshares, The Rumpus, Elle, One Story, and NPR's Selected Shorts, and was an editor of Out.

Johnson was awarded a Stegner Fellowship from Stanford University in 2003. She has also received fellowships to the MacDowell Colony and the Virginia Center for Creative Arts. She currently lives in Flagstaff, Arizona with her partner.

Her book, Stray City takes place in Portland, Oregon in the 1990s and is told in partial epistolary style. It tells the story of a young lesbian who has a fling with a man, gets pregnant, and decides to keep the baby while dealing with the fallout from her community.
