= Miriam Diamond =

Canadian environmental chemist (born 1955)

Miriam L. Diamond (born 1955) is a Canadian environmental chemist and a professor at the University of Toronto. She started the Diamond Environmental Research Group, which works to develop strategies that reduce dangerous contaminants in the environment.

Diamond has been appointed to numerous departments at various universities, she is a member of Scientists 4 CEPA, an editor at the Environmental Science & Technology journal, and a former co-chair of the Ontario Ministry of the Environment's Toxic Reduction Scientific Expert Panel.

== Biography ==
=== Education ===
Diamond received her PhD from the Department of Chemical Engineering and Applied Chemistry at the University of Toronto in 1990, master in mining engineering from Queen's University at Kingston in 1984, master in zoology from the University of Alberta in 1980, and bachelor in biology from the University of Toronto in 1976.

=== Work ===
Diamond is an associate editor of the journal Environmental Science and Technology, a member of the Canadian Chemical Management Plan Science Committee, and a member of the board of directors of the Canadian Environmental Law Association.

She was co-chair of the Ontario Ministry of the Environment's Toxic Reduction Scientific Expert Panel, which advised the minister of the environment on the Toxic Reduction Act, introduced in 2009.

Diamond started the Diamond Environmental Research Group, which helps create strategies to reduce chemical contaminants in the environment.

She has been involved with Scientists 4 CEPA, a group concerned with the environment and the protection of Canada's natural ecosystems.

In July 2023, Diamond became a professor for the Department of Earth Sciences at the University of Toronto.

She has contributed to over 150 publications.

== Honours and awards ==
- 1976: Innis College Medal
- 1981–1982: Max Bell Scholarship for Northern Studies, McGill University
- 1989: John Brown Memorial Prize for Research in Environmental Science and Occupational Health, University of Toronto
- 1989–1990: George Burwash Langford Prize for distinctive contributions to environmental research and services to the Institute for Environmental Studies
- 1999: Ontario Ministry of the Environment Excellence in Research Award to Students
- 1999–2002, 2004, 2005: Dean's Excellence Award, Faculty of Arts and Science, University of Toronto
- 2005: Joseph R. Meyerhoff Visiting Professorship. Weizmann Institute
- 2007: Canadian Environmental Scientist of the Year, Royal Canadian Geographical Society
- 2010: Fellow of the Royal Geographical Society
- 2011: INNOLEC Science Guest Chair in Chemistry, Masaryk University, Czechia
- 2014: Visiting Scientist, Stockholm University, Department of Applied Environmental Science
- 2016: SETAC Fellow
- 2016: University of Toronto Faculty of Arts and Science Deans Award
