= Chelsea Dickenson =

British travel blogger

- Known for: Tipsy Tourism; Passports Please!

Chelsea Dickenson (born 7 February 1990) is a British travel blogger and social media influencer. She is known for her social media posts about how to travel cheaply, find the best deals and how to pack for travel, and provides tips and tricks for budget-friendly vacations.

== how many holidays ==
Dickenson rose to prominence in 2018 when she set herself the challenge of booking as many holidays as she could from the United Kingdom for half the sum the average British household spent on one holiday in the same year. Dickenson's strategies included finding free accommodation in Paris through a cat-sitting website, house-swapping her home in London for a luxurious New York apartment and using a private browser to ensure she received the best deals from price comparison websites. Dickenson's success led her to create the website how many holidays, where she shared tips for other travellers to secure better deals on flights and accommodation. Dickenson also started vlogging her travels via YouTube and creating content for social media websites including Instagram.

== Cheap Holiday Expert ==
In early 2020, Dickenson rebranded under the name Cheap Holiday Expert. During the COVID-19 pandemic and subsequent lockdowns in the United Kingdom, Dickenson created an online challenge called Dash Across the Globe: Europe, where she set people the challenge of travelling from London to Istanbul as cheaply as possible. Dickenson also published regular news from her Instagram account to help travellers from the UK stay up-to-date with changing travel restrictions. While unable to travel overseas, Dickenson collaborated with her partner James Robinson, a radio producer for XFM, to create the podcast Tipsy Tourism, in which the couple combined reviews of lesser-known tourist attractions in the UK with reviews of cheap alcoholic beverages.

From 2023, Dickenson became a regular guest on ITV talk show This Morning, where she would offer travel advice to help people secure cheap travel deals in the UK and abroad.

In 2025, Dickenson and Robinson collaborated again to create the podcast Passports Please!, in which the pair tell entertaining travel anecdotes and offer advice to help travellers enjoy a fulfilling and cost-effective holiday. In the same year, Dickenson changed the name of her digital identity to Holiday Expert, reflecting a shift away from a purely budget-conscious audience towards a more general following. Passports Please! was rebranded as The Holiday Expert Show in July 2026, and expanded to two episodes a week.

== Personal life ==
Dickenson was born in Wrexham. She lives in North London with her partner James Robinson, whom she met while studying at the University of Manchester.
