= Chelsea Leyland =

British DJ and activist

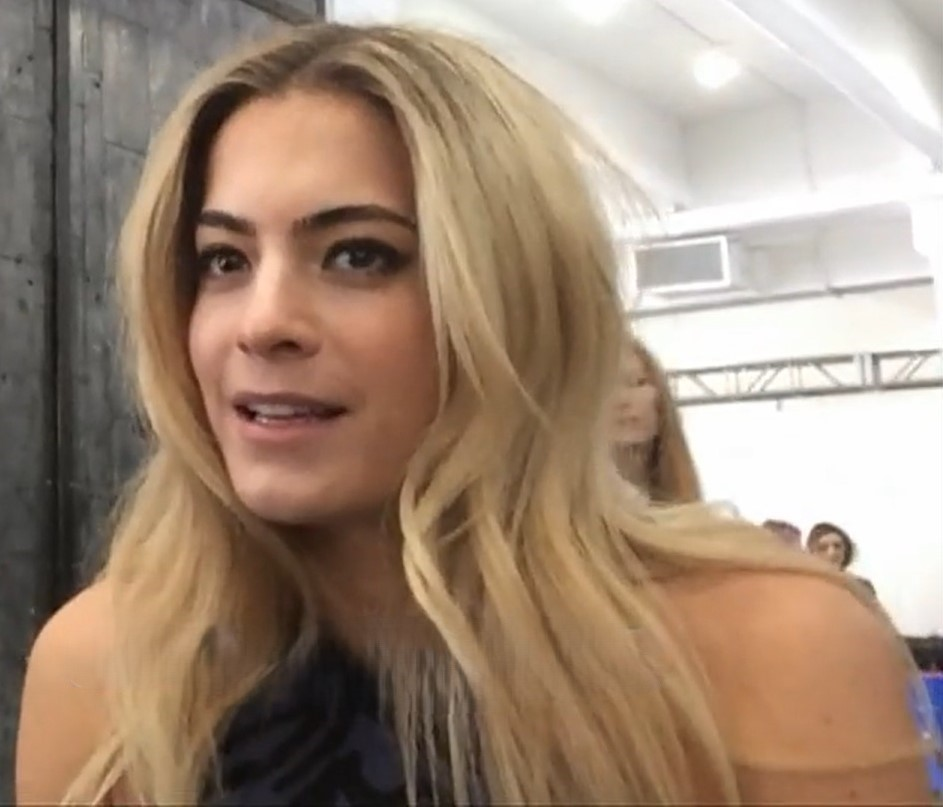
- Leyland interviewed at New York Fashion Week 2014
- Born: London, England
- Occupations: DJ, cannabis and epilepsy activist, model
- Website: chelsealeyland.com

Chelsea Leyland is an English disc jockey, cannabis and epilepsy activist and model. As of 2013, she lives in Brooklyn, New York, United States.

== Early life ==
Leyland was born in London, England and attended Bedales Boarding School. She moved to New York City after graduating high school to pursue an acting career. She studied method acting at the Lee Strasberg Theatre and Film Institute prior to becoming a DJ and became interested in deejaying after recommending a DJ friend for various fashion events.

== Career ==
=== Deejaying ===
Leyland has earned the moniker “fashion's DJ” from her work in the fashion industry. She has been recognized for her eclectic DJ style, with her selections including hip-hop, rock, reggae, electro, house, metal and other genres including music from the 1950s and 60s. Leyland deejayed The 2018 DVF Awards. celebrating Philanthropists and Style Powerhouses, Pal Norte's 2018 Music Festival in Monterrey, Mexico, Chelsea is also a Beats 1 host with Apple Radio, and has spoken out about her activism in podcasts including Steve Hash and Ally Hilfiger's "Sit In" and Ovid Therapeutics' BoldMedicine.

Leyland deejayed at the Stylecaster NYFW Celebration and for the opening of a new Burberry store at Bloomingdales in New York City, New York in 2011. She has also deejayed for Cole Haan in New York City, New York. She deejayed at Valentino's Fashion Night Out and his Benefit for the Lincoln Center Institute for the Arts.

Leyland deejayed for Armani during Aramani's 2013 Travel Style showcase and Milan Fashion Week 2013. She also deejayed for designer Naeem Khan on three separate occasions. Other notable designers she deejayed for include Fendi, Missoni, Chanel, Vogue, Christian Louboutin, Prabal Gurung and Diane von Furstenberg.

Leyland's deejay debut was at Valentino's 2010 Fashion Night Out Celebrity Poker Tournament. Leyland opened for Duran Duran at Paper magazine's 2011 Beautiful People event. She also opened for Diplo and Santigold during her work for fashion designer Cole Haan. She has worked with Nicki Minaj and deejayed alongside Harry Styles of One Direction during London Fashion Week in 2013.

Leyland deejayed for Ben Watt's annual Shark Attack Sounds Fourth of July party in 2011 and 2013. She also deejayed for the 2011 Brazil Foundation Gala at the New York Public Library and for eBay and Jonathan Alder during the 2011 opening of The Inspiration Shop.

Leyland has deejayed for artists including Damien Hirst's gallery opening at the Soho House in Berlin, Germany and for Kehinde Wiley's Art Basel show in Miami, Florida. She has also deejayed at the Whitney and Guggenheim museums and for curator Vito Schnabel.

Leyland deejayed in Tel Aviv, Israel in 2013 for the opening of an exhibit at the Holon Design Museum. She also deejayed at the 2013 amfAR Gala in São Paulo, Brazil, and in Marrakesh, Morocco, for social networking site ASmallWorld. She has deejayed in Milan, Italy and Berlin, Germany twice.

=== Cannabis and epilepsy activism ===
Leyland suffers from a form of epilepsy called 'Juvenile Myoclonic Epilepsy' which she has been battling with since her early teens. Leyland's sister suffers from a more severe form of epilepsy and as a result lives in full-time care at The Epilepsy Society in the UK. In 2016 Leyland came off of all pharmaceutical medicines and has been treating her epilepsy with Cannabidiol (CBD) ever since. It has had a dramatic impact on her health, and she has been seizure free ever since. Leyland began co-producing "Separating the Strains" in 2017, a documentary accompanying Leyland on her journey as she explores the medicinal cannabis climate in both the US and UK. The film aims to de-stigmatize both epilepsy and cannabis.

In 2017, Leyland was featured in Harpers Bazaar sharing her personal story and discussing her work as an activist. Leyland has been featured for her work as an activist in numerous publications including Teen Vogue, W Magazine Gossamer, MILK, Stoned Fox, and Miss Grass' video series.

=== Modeling ===
Leyland has been showcased in MTV and Unilever's Dove brand's women DJ campaign. Leyland was the face of Cole Haan's 2012 fall promotional campaign. She is professionally represented in the United States by William Morris Endeavor (WME).

=== Film ===
Leyland has also appeared in the independent films Charmed and The Best Man. She starred in a fashion short film by StyleCaster entitled Snow Blind .

== Philanthropy ==
Leyland closely supports the Epilepsy Society, a UK based epilepsy and neurological organization which provides full-time care for her sister, Tamsin. Chelsea collaborated with Mark Cross to design a handbag giving a percentage of sales to the Epilepsy Society.

Leyland participated in the 2012 Charity Meets Fashion charity fashion show. She was an honorary chair for the 2012 Charity Ball Benefiting Charity: Water and has worked with ACRIA, a HIV/AIDS charity. Leyland deejayed for the Free Arts NYC charity art auction on multiple occasions. She also deejayed for The Museum of Art and Design's Young Patrons Gala.

== Personal life ==
Leyland's father owned London-based restaurant Foxtrot Oscar prior to its sale to chef Gordon Ramsay and managed the London Playboy Club during the 1970s. Her sister is epileptic and autistic.
