= List of Snapped episodes =

List of television series episodes

Snapped is an American true crime television series produced by Jupiter Entertainment which depicts high-profile or bizarre cases of women accused of murder. There are 710 episodes.

== Series overview ==
Season	Episodes	Originally released	
Season	Episodes	First released	Last released
1	14	August 6, 2004	October 24, 2004
2	13	February 20, 2005	May 22, 2005
3	13	October 2, 2005	December 4, 2005
4	13	October 1, 2006	December 17, 2006
5	13	April 30, 2007	August 19, 2007
6	27	October 7, 2007	August 17, 2008
7	36	January 8, 2009	November 28, 2010
8	15	February 20, 2011	April 1, 2012
9	26	April 8, 2012	January 20, 2013
10	22	January 27, 2013	August 18, 2013
11	13	September 1, 2013	January 5, 2014
12	10	January 12, 2014	April 13, 2014
13	15	April 20, 2014	October 5, 2014
14	14	November 9, 2014	March 15, 2015
15	13	March 22, 2015	August 23, 2015
16	13	September 6, 2015	January 31, 2016
17	13	February 14, 2016	July 24, 2016
18	13	August 7, 2016	November 6, 2016
19	13	November 13, 2016	February 26, 2017
20	11	May 14, 2017	July 30, 2017
21	13	August 6, 2017	November 12, 2017
22	7	November 19, 2017	January 14, 2018
23	26	January 21, 2018	August 12, 2018
24	26	August 19, 2018	March 3, 2019
25	26	March 10, 2019	August 25, 2019
26	27	September 1, 2019	March 1, 2020
27	25	March 8, 2020	August 30, 2020
28	26	September 6, 2020	March 21, 2021
29	26	April 4, 2021	October 3, 2021
30	26	October 10, 2021	April 10, 2022
31	26	July 17, 2022	February 5, 2023
32	26	February 19, 2023	October 22, 2023
33	24	October 29, 2023	June 30, 2024
34	24	July 7, 2024	December 29, 2024
35	25	January 5, 2025	October 19, 2025
36	24	January 4, 2026	October 11, 2026

== Season 1 (2004) ==
Snapped Season 1 episodes
No. overall	No. in season	Title	Original release date
1	1	"Celeste Beard Johnson"	August 6, 2004
The frustrated wife of a multi-millionaire convinced her lesbian lover to kill her husband. Her fatal mistake was abandoning her lover soon after the crime.
2	2	"Virginia Larzelere"	August 6, 2004
Did Virginia Larzelere, the wife of a Florida dentist, convince her own sons to kill her husband for the insurance money?
3	3	"Clara Harris"	August 13, 2004
Clara Harris, a successful dentist, mowed down her philandering orthodontist husband with her Mercedes. What drove her to this final, desperate act?
4	4	"Elena Kiejliches"	August 20, 2004
Elena Kiejliches, the wife of a wealthy Russian businessman, shot her husband in their Staten Island mansion before taking a trip to Disney World. However, the police were soon on her trail.
5	5	"Kimberly Hricko"	August 27, 2004
A romantic weekend getaway went awry when, rather than rekindle their marriage, a woman poisoned her husband and then set fire to his body. What made her snap?
6	6	"Lee Ann Reidel"	September 3, 2004
An upper-middle-class woman and her lover allegedly conspire to kill her husband but the wrong man is murdered.
7	7	"Ruthann Aron"	September 10, 2004
This wealthy real estate developer hired a hit man to kill her husband and a lawyer who opposed her political ambitions. Was she mentally ill at the time?
8	8	"Joyce Cohen"	September 17, 2004
This pampered trophy wife hired three people to kill her multi-millionaire husband in a fake home invasion robbery. What drove her to commit this brutal act?
9	9	"Susan Wright"	September 24, 2004
A middle-class Houston housewife ties her husband to their bed and stabs him 192 times. Then she tries to pass it off as self-defense. What caused her to snap?
10	10	"Diane Zamora"	October 1, 2004
This former Navy cadet was just 19 when she learned her high school sweetheart had cheated on her. As atonement for his betrayal, she made her boyfriend help kill her rival.
11	11	"Kristin Rossum"	October 9, 2004
A beautiful Californian forensic scientist used the knowledge gained from her work to murder her cuckolded husband and make it look like suicide. How was she caught?
12	12	"Debra Baker"	October 15, 2004
In this variant on "Arsenic and Old Lace," a millionaire's bookkeeper is accused of conspiring with his wife to poison him.
13	13	"Carolyn Warmus"	October 22, 2004
This millionaire heiress murdered her lover's wife so she could have him for herself. What drove her to carry out the brutal act?
14	14	"Betty and Peggy"	October 24, 2004
Did twin sisters Peggy Lowe and Betty Wilson hire a hit man to kill Betty's husband, Dr. Jack Wilson? Could the hit man's testimony be believed?

== Season 2 (2005) ==
Snapped Season 2 Episodes
No. overall	No. in season	Title	Original release date
15	1	"Adele Craven"	February 20, 2005
When a successful airline pilot and family man was found dead in his basement, his wife was the prime suspect. But was the churchgoing housewife really capable of murder?
16	2	"Rita Gluzman"	February 27, 2005
New Jersey police discover a man dumping body parts into a river. The deceased is a brilliant scientist who recently had an affair. His wife is the prime suspect for the crime.
17	3	"Sharee Miller"	March 3, 2005
When a Michigan salvage magnate was shot dead, police suspected a robbery gone bad, until his widow's secret internet double life was revealed. Note: This episode had a two-hour followup that aired on 12 May 2024.
18	4	"Elisa McNabney"	March 6, 2005
The body of a successful attorney is found in a shallow grave. Before police can interview his wife, she flees the scene and commits suicide. Did guilt drive her to death?
19	5	"Terri Gilbert"	March 17, 2005
A wife shot her husband after mistaking him for an intruder. It was an open and shut case until investigators discovered that her first husband met a very similar fate.
20	6	"Donna Somerville"	March 20, 2005
When a wealthy Virginian farmer died in his bed, authorities assumed he had a heart attack, but an autopsy revealed massive amounts of drugs. Did his wife kill him?
21	7	"Brenda Andrew"	March 27, 2005
When her husband was shot dead on their driveway, Brenda Andrew played the grieving widow. But an illicit affair and an insurance scam were uncovered as her reasons to kill.
22	8	"Stephanie Stephens"	April 3, 2005
When a wealthy heart surgeon was found dead, the finger of suspicion pointed at his former beauty queen wife. Did she administer a lethal cocktail of drugs?
23	9	"Amy DeChant"	April 10, 2005
When a Las Vegas bookie went missing, his pretty girlfriend claimed he was in trouble with the mob. An investigation proved that she killed him and hid his body in the desert.
24	10	"Linda Jones"	April 24, 2005
Police believed that the brutal beating and murder of Linda Jones' husband was a robbery gone wrong, but when one of the attackers was caught an even darker picture emerged.
25	11	"Dionne Baugh"	May 8, 2005
Outraged that her multi-millionaire boyfriend wants to end their affair, a cheating wife bashes his head in and nearly gets away with it.
26	12	"Dante Sutorius"	May 15, 2005
When a rich doctor got a second chance at marital bliss, no-one believed he could commit suicide within their first year of marriage. Authorities discovered his new wife was a killer, not a blushing bride.
27	13	"Pamela Smart"	May 22, 2005
A married educator returns home to find her husband shot dead. Police suspected a robbery until a tip off revealed an affair with a student that was to die for.

== Season 3 (2005) ==
Snapped Season 3 episodes
No. overall	No. in season	Title	Original release date
28	1	"Donna Yaklich"	October 2, 2005
When a narcotics detective was shot dead, his wife was convicted of plotting the hit. But did she do it in revenge for years of physical and mental abuse?
29	2	"Yesenia Patino"	October 9, 2005
When the married lover of transsexual Yesenia Patino was found dead, she became prime suspect. Did she really batter her rival or was she framed by her lover?
30	3	"Manuela Garcia"	October 16, 2005
The Garcias seemed to be a happy family until Manuela killed her husband with an axe. The investigation exposed a life of unhappiness, abuse and desperation.
31	4	"Jeena Han"	October 23, 2005
Identical twins Jeena and Sunny had a love/hate relationship. Their sibling rivalry would eventually escalate to burglary, identity theft and murder.
32	5	"Dora Cisneros"	October 30, 2005
When Dora Cisneros' daughter was dumped by her high school sweetheart, she decided to teach him a lesson. He was later found dead. Was Dora guilty of murder?
33	6	"Kimberley Kondejewski"	November 6, 2005
A housewife who was abused for years by her overbearing husband was asked to commit suicide so he could get rich. She decided that he was the one to die.
34	7	"Mary Thompson"	November 13, 2005
She crusaded against gangs and helped police gain convictions, but a murder case proved that Mary Thompson had a much darker side. Was she also a killer?
35	8	"Laura Rogers"	November 20, 2005
When she married for the second time, Laura Rogers thought she would live happily ever after. But her daughter's allegations of abuse prompted a brutal murder.
36	9	"Linda Lou Charbonneau"	November 27, 2005
She left her partner of 20 years for his young nephew, but weeks later both men were dead. Was Linda Lou a Black Widow, or an unwitting dupe?
37	10	"Stella Nickell"	December 4, 2005
When cyanide-tainted aspirin were found in a Washington chemists, the trail led back to a dissatisfied housewife determined to get her hands on her husband's insurance money.
38	11	"Kimberly Anderson"	December 12, 2005
The beautiful blonde shot her husband when their divorce turned nasty. Pleading self-defence, she was acquitted in court, but the dead man's family weren't satisfied.
39	12	"Gail Bennett"	December 18, 2005
This battered housewife shot and wounded her violent spouse, but instead of protecting Gail, the local sheriff raped her. She had to file a civil suit to fight for justice.
40	13	"Deidra Lane"	December 4, 2005
The wife of a successful football star and mother of two, Deidra seemed to lead a charmed life. But when she shot her husband dead at point-blank range she pleaded self-defence.

== Season 4 (2006) ==
Snapped Season 4 episodes
No. overall	No. in season	Title	Original release date
41	1	"Sandy Murphy"	October 1, 2006
When she started dating wealthy casino heir Ted Binion, Sandy seemed to have hit the jackpot. But when Binion was found dead, she became the prime suspect.
42	2	"Carol Carr"	October 8, 2006
The desperate wife and mother had watched her husband suffer for years from a debilitating disease, but when her son fell ill, she was compelled to take drastic action.
43	3	"Erin Dukes"	October 15, 2006
A battered housewife, Erin knew she had to escape her brutal spouse for the sake of her children. However, her husband refused to let her go and she had to fight for her freedom.
44	4	"Donna Fryman"	October 22, 2006
She shot her husband three times after their business collapsed and he embarked on an affair, but would a jury believe her claim of self-defence?
45	5	"Dixie Shanahan"	October 29, 2006
The battered Iowan farmwife shot her husband in the head, then left his body festering for a year before authorities became suspicious at his disappearance.
46	6	"Sheila Davalloo"	November 5, 2006
A kinky game went horribly wrong when Sheila handcuffed and blindfolded her husband before stabbing him in the chest. Despite her excuses, police believed she meant to kill.
47	7	"Phyllis Nelson"	November 12, 2006
When her estranged husband embarked on a new relationship, Phyllis confronted him in a heated argument that ended with her husband being stabbed to death.
48	8	"Nikki Redmond"	November 19, 2006
The Savannah beauty queen shot dead her boyfriend after tracking him down to his fiancée's home. However, she claimed that she was defending herself after he went for his gun.
49	9	"Piper Rountree"	November 26, 2006
When she lost custody of her children and the bulk of her marital assets in a bitter divorce, Piper Rountree gunned down her former husband in a cold-blooded attack.
50	10	"Mary Ellen Samuels"	December 3, 2006
When her husband was found dead, police were left baffled by a trail of death and deceit that saw hitmen hired to kill the hitmen who had murdered Mary Ellen's spouse.
51	11	"Melinda Raisch"	December 10, 2006
Two decades after her husband was brutally shot to death in a robbery at their home, soccer mum Melinda faced further questioning over what really happened that fateful day.
52	12	"Sarah Johnson"	December 17, 2006
After the rebellious 16-year-old was grounded for sneaking out to see her boyfriend, her parents were found brutally murdered. Did teenage angst take a deadly turn?
53	13	"Joan Shannon"	December 17, 2006
Joan Shannon's soldier husband was shot to death by her teenaged daughter; authorities suspected that mom may have played a role in the demise of her well-insured spouse.

== Season 5 (2007) ==
Snapped Season 5 episodes
No. overall	No. in season	Title	Original release date
54	1	"Michelle Theer"	April 30, 2007
When her Air Force Captain husband was shot dead, investigators blamed Michelle's lover, but when they tried to arrest the widow for conspiracy, she had vanished.
55	2	"Martha Freeman"	May 6, 2007
A look at how Martha Freeman's husband was bludgeoned to death after he discovered his wife's lover secretly living in a closet in his house.
56	3	"Amy Bosley"	May 13, 2007
A bookkeeper gets behind on taxes for the family business, and her husband turns up dead before he can learn about her secret.
57	4	"Kimberly Cunningham"	May 20, 2007
Kimberly Cunningham trusted her sister's longtime boyfriend, but when she found out he was abusing her children, murder was on her mind.
58	5	"Margaret Rudin"	May 27, 2007
Margaret Frost married real-estate mogul Ron Rudin and was happy to spend his fortune, but his womanising and alcohol would lead to a sticky end for Ron.
59	6	"Jane Dorotik"	June 3, 2007
Jane Dorotik's marriage had hit the rocks. In February 2000, after years of marital turmoil, her husband was discovered beaten and stabbed to death.
60	7	"Susan Polk"	June 10, 2007
When Susan Bolling's parents sent her to therapist Felix Polk, their relationship blossomed into marriage and children, but their feuds would lead to murder.
61	8	"Vicki Monroe"	July 15, 2007
To their customers, popular Louisville bar owners Vicky and Gerald Monroe seemed like a close couple, but their long days working together would result in murder.
62	9	"Claire Welsh"	July 22, 2007
Claire Welsh was the all-American girl, but she could not seem to master her personal life. Was it a case of 'fatal' attraction when she started dating lover John Mileski?
63	10	"Mary Krueger"	July 29, 2007
Mary and Roland Krueger's marriage was less than idyllic. Mary discovered that Rollie was a paying local girl for sex, a discovery which would drive Mary to murder.
64	11	"Brookey Lee West"	August 5, 2007
Brookey Lee West had a love/hate relationship with her alcoholic mother. Scarred by her childhood, her life would lead to Satan worship and murder.
65	12	"Daphne Wright"	August 12, 2007
Deaf lesbian Daphne lived a hard life in the conservative Midwest. When her romantic rival was murdered, she found herself facing the death penalty. Did she commit the crime?
66	13	"Melanie McGuire"	August 19, 2007
In May 2004, nurse Melanie McGuire told friends that her husband of five years had walked out on her. But days later his dismembered body washed up on the shore.

== Season 6 (2007–2008) ==
Snapped Season 6 episodes
No. overall	No. in season	Title	Original release date
67	1	"Mary Winkler"	October 7, 2007
A cheerful wife shoots her pastor husband and flees with her kids. Acquitted of murder, she was sentenced to 210 days for manslaughter. What caused her to kill?
68	2	"Jessica McCord"	October 14, 2007
Jessica McCord spent seven years fighting her ex-husband over custody of their two daughters, until she convinced her new husband to end the custody battle with a bullet.
69	3	"Adrienne Emily Hickson"	October 21, 2007
Possessive student Adrienne Hickson was looking forward to a career in criminal law, but a spat with her boyfriend would see her as a defendant, not an attorney.
70	4	"Sarah Brady"	October 28, 2007
How could a confrontation about a baby registration mix-up lead expectant mother Sarah Brady to kill Katie Smith in her apartment?
71	5	"Elizabeth Reynolds"	November 4, 2007
Elizabeth Reynolds spent thousands on cosmetic surgery to please her lover. After she discovered he was cheating on her, she spent a thousand more to have him killed.
72	6	"Lynn Turner"	November 11, 2007
Lynn Turner was a keen cook, but when her boyfriend died suddenly, just like her husband years before, her special cooking ingredient was uncovered: antifreeze.
73	7	"Kathleen Denson"	November 18, 2007
Wealthy ranch owner Kathleen Denson's life of money, sex and drugs came to a halt when her boyfriend was shot and she was caught with the smoking gun.
74	8	"Misty Witherspoon"	January 6, 2008
When Misty Witherspoon's policeman husband was found shot dead, it appeared to be nothing more than a tragic accident. But was the grieving widow really all she seemed?
75	9	"Cynthia George"	January 13, 2008
Former beauty queen and socialite Cynthia George would regularly make the society columns. But after a gruesome 2001 murder, she made headlines for all the wrong reasons.
76	10	"Lisa Whedbee"	January 20, 2008
The chilling tale of a frustrated wife and overworked mother who thought that by murdering her husband, she could finally be free. She was, sadly, mistaken.
77	11	"Erika Sifrit"	January 27, 2008
Discover how a selection of hidden mementos exposed a happily married businesswoman as the cold-blooded killer of a local couple who had mysteriously disappeared.
78	12	"Malaika Griffin"	February 3, 2008
Malaika Griffin was a gifted chemist who worked in a biotech lab, but she had a past she wouldn't talk about. One that included a dangerous secret and a motive for murder.
79	13	"Sharon Daniels"	February 10, 2008
School teacher Sharon Daniels was a patient woman, but her patience wore thin when her husband started abusing her. She turned to the police and later a loaded gun to solve her problems.
80	14	"Michelle Michael"	April 6, 2008
Bored with her job and her marriage, a nurse gives her husband a lethal injection and sets the house on fire in an attempt to collect the insurance.
81	15	"Linda Henning"	April 13, 2008
Designer Linda Henning fell under the spell of a conman and was later charged with his wife's murder. Did she kill? Discover a bizarre case involving aliens and brainwashing.
82	16	"Darlene Gentry"	April 20, 2008
Marriage and kids didn't stop Darlene from drinking and dancing, and when money troubles threaten her fun, she realises her husband was worth more to her dead than alive.
83	17	"Monique Berkley"	April 27, 2008
A look at the crimes of Monique Berkley, who masterminded the shooting of her husband with the help of her alleged teenage lover and her stepdaughter's boyfriend.
84	18	"Shayne Lovera"	May 4, 2008
With the help of her lover, Shayne Lovera allegedly bludgeoned her husband to death and staged his murder as an accident. But was love the motive... or money?
85	19	"Ann Trexler"	May 11, 2008
Ann Trexler moved to Florida to spend more time with her granddaughter. When the girl's father decided to move her to Montana, Ann brings the relocation plan to a dead stop.
86	20	"Kerri Fae Brown"	May 18, 2008
When nursing home administrator Kerri Brown was on the verge of being sacked for cooking books, she laid her hands on a gun and did some firing of her own.
87	21	"Ann Miller Kontz"	July 6, 2008
When an unfaithful chemist wanted out of her marriage, she preferred arsenic to divorce proceedings, embroiling her lover in her deadly scheme.
88	22	"Elicia Hughes"	July 13, 2008
When a teacher's husband leaves for a night out, his lover and his wife wait up for his return, having already prepared a deadly lesson.
89	23	"Linda Fields"	July 20, 2008
When a ranch hand's body is found in a river, the police have little to go on, until a money trail leads them to Linda Fields and her husband and a grim truth is revealed.
90	24	"Tracey Frame"	July 27, 2008
When Tracey Frame and her boyfriend engaged in a property dispute, the consequences became deadly. After a bitter break-up, she shot him and dumped his partially-burned body in a drain.
91	25	"Shawna Nelson"	August 3, 2008
When her long-term lover refused to end his marriage, Shawna Nelson snapped. Gun in hand, she drove to his wife's office and waited for her love rival outside.
92	26	"Jeanette Sliwinski"	August 10, 2008
On the morning of 14 July 2005, Jeanette Sliwinski drove through her Illinois town at 90mph, killing three men. What caused this pretty student to act so recklessly?
93	27	"Leslie MacKool"	August 17, 2008
When Leslie's father leaves her little cash in his will, she's prepared to murder her mother to get her hands on the family fortune.

== Season 7 (2009–2010) ==
Snapped Season 7 episodes
No. overall	No. in season	Title	Original release date
94	1	"Ashley Humphrey"	January 8, 2009
Teen bride Ashley Humphrey gave her husband exactly what he wanted as a wedding gift - she murdered a woman who was charging him for assault.
95	2	"Larissa Schuster"	January 15, 2009
When a soon-to-be divorced father fails to turn up for work, police find his keys, wallet, phone and then body floating in tank of acid. What caused his killer to snap?
96	3	"Cindy Sommer"	January 22, 2009
When a seemingly fit and healthy Marine drops dead, doctors believe it was a tragic accident. But when a second test reveals arsenic in his system, foul play is suspected.
97	4	"Mechele Linehan"	January 29, 2009
A cold case involving an ex-stripper heats up when investigators revisit the 1996 shooting death of a commercial fisherman in Alaska.
98	5	"Beth Carpenter"	February 5, 2009
Investigators link the death of an odd job man to a highly respected lawyer, a custody battle for a young child and a determined aunt's conspiracy to murder.
99	6	"Monique Johnson"	February 12, 2009
When a policeman is murdered, investigators are quick to arrest his troubled girlfriend, but was it cold-blooded murder? Or can she prove she killed him in self defence?
100	7	"Susan Grund"	June 4, 2009
When a district attorney is found dead on his sofa, a family realises that loyalty means nothing, but will the right person pay for the crime?
101	8	"Lisa Costello"	June 11, 2009
When Frank Black went missing, business rival Alan Mackerley and Lisa Costello were behind the grisly truth. Did they get away with it?
102	9	"Jocelyn Dooley"	June 18, 2009
Police investigate the murder of a popular casino employee who was just a signature away from divorcing his wife.
103	10	"Renee Poole"	June 25, 2009
An anniversary celebration turns tragic when a young husband is gunned down during what appears to be a beach-front robbery but proves to be so much more.
104	11	"Nikki Reynolds"	October 4, 2009
Just after her dad had left for church, teenager Nikki called the police and confessed to a murder. When the cops arrived, they found her mother, violently stabbed to death.
105	12	"Jennifer Hyatte"	October 11, 2009
Faced with a life apart, a former nurse frees her husband by shooting his prison guards as he is transported from court, but just how long did they get to spend together?
106	13	"Rhonda Orr"	October 18, 2009
Rhonda Orr's neighbours tried to help her and her husband when a fire started - but this fire was no accident.
107	14	"Erin McLean"	October 25, 2009
When a married teacher's student lover moves into the home she shares with her husband, a deadly love triangle is formed that leads to an emotionally driven murder.
108	15	"Shannon Torrez"	November 1, 2009
In a shocking case, a mother is left for dead and her baby stolen when she does the kindly thing and lets an unknown woman into her house to use the telephone.
109	16	"Monique Turenne"	November 8, 2009
After a Canadian Air Force Major is found mysteriously slain in his driveway, police uncover a secret affair that could have led to his permanent grounding.
110	17	"Kelly Forbes"	November 15, 2009
Kelly and Michael Forbes' honeymoon period came to an abrupt end when, after just two months of marriage, the recent groom was found strangled in their New York home.
111	18	"Jill Rockcastle"	January 17, 2010
When a high-roller was found stabbed to death in his luxury Las Vegas apartment in 2007, police suspected his missing wife held the key to his violent murder.
112	19	"Denise Miller"	January 24, 2010
After a police officer's death is set up as suicide, investigators turn to the murdered man's girlfriend, only to discover that she has completely vanished.
113	20	"Tracie Andrews"	January 31, 2010
The British public got behind Andrews when she sadly revealed how she witnessed her husband's murder, but did she? Or did investigators see through her crocodile tears?
114	21	"Anne Marie Stout"	May 2, 2010
When a man is found shot to death in his Montana home, police uncover a curious case of fatal attraction, as his wife points the blame at her husband's disgruntled ex-lover.
115	22	"Rhonda Glover"	May 9, 2010
A Texas beauty queen faces a different kind of judge when she's accused of shooting her oilman ex. Can she convince the jury it was self defence?
116	23	"Karen Tobie"	May 16, 2010
After a plumber is shot dead on his doorstep, investigators needn't search far for their culprits, uncovering a sinister plot between his wife and their next door neighbour.
117	24	"Jane Andrews"	June 6, 2010
Police fear for the life of a missing woman, after her millionaire lover is found stabbed to death, but is she a victim too? Could his bullying have driven her to murder?
118	25	"Diane Fleming"	June 20, 2010
When a mother is accused of spiking her husband's drink, the community divides into those who think his death was accidental and those who think he was deliberately poisoned.
119	26	"Amanda McGhee"	August 22, 2010
The case of 15-year-old Amanda McGhee, who was convicted of second-degree murder after helping her boyfriend shoot her parents in Knox County, Tennessee.
120	27	"Michelle Hall"	August 29, 2010
An eight-year-old girl recalls the events that resulted in her mother, Michelle Hall, being sentenced to life in prison in Georgia for the shooting of her husband, John.
121	28	"Stacey Castor"	September 12, 2010
Stacey Castor's family had a habit of dying - until her daughter Ashley survived a 'suicide attempt' which was, in fact, attempted murder by Stacey.
122	29	"Esther Wadley"	September 19, 2010
When Joshua Mlllager received an unexpected phone call from police telling him there was a plot on his life, his doctor ex-wife Esther was to blame.
123	30	"Carla Hughes"	September 26, 2010
The case of Mississippi teacher Carla Hughes, who was convicted of murdering her lover's pregnant fiancée and the woman's unborn child.
124	31	"Michelle Reynolds"	October 3, 2010
When Thad Reynolds was discovered dead, his close friend Scott was involved - but so was his wife, Michelle, who'd been having an affair with Scott.
125	32	"Martha Pineda"	October 10, 2010
When Martha Pineda's toyboy Ilya left her for a younger model, she took her revenge - and he wound up dead. What happened to her?
126	33	"Shannon Crawley"	October 24, 2010
Shannon Crawley's affair with Jermeir Jackson Stroud ended tragically when she murdered his long term girlfriend, Denita.
127	34	"Karen Grauber"	November 7, 2010
When daycare owner Karen Grauber called 911 and admitted killing her husband, she said it was self defence. Was she telling the truth?
128	35	"Kelley Cannon"	November 14, 2010
When Jim Cannon died, his ex-wife Kelley was immediately implicated. She was convicted of murder and handed a life sentence.
129	36	"Brigitte Harris"	November 28, 2010
When Eric Goodridge's mutilated body was discovered, his daughter Brigitte was responsible - but what were the reasons behind her actions?

== Season 8 (2011–2012) ==
Snapped Season 8 episodes
No. overall	No. in season	Title	Original release date
130	1	"Tausha Morton"	February 20, 2011
Four years after the crime was committed, Tausha Morton was found guilty of ordering her lover to shoot her husband.
131	2	"Marcia Kelly"	March 20, 2011
James Kelly is found dead in his home. Did convicted wife Marcia orchestrate his death? Did his stepdaughter's hatred turn deadly?
132	3	"Courtney Schulhoff"	April 3, 2011
In 2004, Courtney Schulhoff confessed to murdering her father when she was 16. Her dad had forbidden her to see her boyfriend, spurring the two lovers to seek revenge.
133	4	"Kelly Ryan"	May 19, 2011
A look at how Kelly Ryan snapped, allegedly murdering her assistant and husband's supposed lover Melissa James, and disposing of her body in a burning car.
134	5	"Wendi Andriano"	June 2, 2011
Chasing a life insurance policy and tired of waiting for cancer to kill her husband, Wendi Andriano bludgeoned him and then slashed his throat while he lay in bed.
135	6	"Amber Trudell"	September 4, 2011
When Amber Trudell snapped, her affair came to a deadly end. In 2003, she dramatically revealed her secret life when she fired a bullet through her lover's head.
136	7	"Sarah Kolb"	September 18, 2011
Schoolgirl Sarah Kolb allegedly murdered class rival Adrianne Reynolds during a lunch break in January 2005, choking, beating and burning her before sawing her into pieces.
137	8	"Linda Pedroza"	October 2, 2011
Linda Pedroza strangled her mother with the help of her boyfriend before pouring acid over the body and dumping it in the woods. What drove the teenager to murder?
138	9	"Michelle Hetzel"	October 9, 2011
A throat slashing death in June 2000 and a tale of romantic entanglement unravels in the tale of Michelle Hetzel.
139	10	"Dalia Dippolito"	January 8, 2012
A young woman is caught on tape plotting to kill her husband.
140	11	"Jessica Riggins"	January 15, 2012
A look at the case of Jessica Riggins, who snapped in 2007 when she shot her husband before trying to flee the country. What drove her to murder?
141	12	"Courtenay Savage"	January 29, 2012
A chilling look at how lingerie model Courtenay Savage took her chances and went on the run after police charged her with attempted murder.
142	13	"Nancy Seaman"	February 19, 2012
An award-winning elementary school teacher becomes the subject matter when her husband goes missing.
143	14	"Ashleigh Pechaluk"	March 25, 2012
A Canadian woman gets caught up in a love triangle and, ultimately, a murder investigation.
144	15	"Sarah Jo Pender"	April 1, 2012
Convicted along with her former boyfriend of the cold-blooded murder of their two roommates in 2000, Sarah Jo Pender was sentenced to 110 years in prison.

== Season 9 (2012–2013) ==
Snapped Season 9 episodes
No. overall	No. in season	Title	Original release date
145	1	"Joanna Hayes"	April 8, 2012
A close look at the crime, trial and psyche of Joanna Hayes, who shot her son's soon-to-be ex-wife at pointblank range after she took custody of her grandson.
146	2	"Ellen Snyder"	April 15, 2012
A shocking look at how Ellen Snyder shot her husband before asking her son to help bury his body. Investigators found his remains eight years after his death.
147	3	"Clara Schwartz"	April 29, 2012
A shocking look at how a young woman's obsession with fantasy role-playing games ended with the real world murder of her father.
148	4	"Jennifer Bowen"	May 6, 2012
In 2009, Jennifer Bowen and her new husband sought to resolve custody issues surrounding Jennifer's daughter by shooting her ex at point-blank range.
149	5	"Regina Williams"	May 20, 2012
A look at the trial of Regina Williams who pleaded guilty to the second-degree murder of her boyfriend in 2004. What caused her to snap?
150	6	"Tyonne Palmer"	June 3, 2012
A secret affair between a preacher and his son's carer ends in the death of the preacher's wife. The question remains, who engineered the murder?
151	7	"Tracey Richter"	June 10, 2012
A mother is hailed as a hero when she kills a home intruder - but a secret journal leads police to suspect she may have planned a cold-blooded murder.
152	8	"Raynella Leath"	June 17, 2012
A look at the crimes and trial of Raynella Leath who was sentenced to 51 years in prison for the cold-blooded murder of her husband.
153	9	"Marni Yang"	June 24, 2012
A look at former model Marni Yang's jealousy-fuelled murder of Rhoni Reuter, the pregnant girlfriend of ex-Chicago Bear Shaun Gayle.
154	10	"Shannon Baugus"	July 15, 2012
A fight over the remote control turns deadly when an abused wife turns the tables on her husband. Did the jury deem it murder or self-defence?
155	11	"Nanette Johnston"	July 29, 2012
Seventeen years after her millionaire boyfriend was murdered, Nanette Johnston and a former lover stood trial for his murder. But which one was guilty?
156	12	"Rennie Pratt"	August 5, 2012
A look at the case of Rennie Pratt who shot her boyfriend in 2009. She claimed she was simply trying to unload a gun. Was it murder or an unlucky accident?
157	13	"Nicole Abusharif"	September 9, 2012
A lesbian love triangle turns deadly when one woman disappears and police look to the other two for answers.
158	14	"Jessica Hill"	September 16, 2012
A look at the case of Jessica Hill, who is serving a 50- year sentence for the shooting of her husband on his farm in 2007.
159	15	"Taylor Marks"	September 23, 2012
A mother responds to her estranged daughter's call for help and walks into a deadly trap.
160	16	"Stephanie Lazarus"	September 30, 2012
An L.A. police detective turns suspect when DNA cracks a 23-year murder mystery.
161	17	"Rachel Wade"	October 7, 2012
A look at how a confrontation between two teenagers turned deadly when 19-year-old Rachel Wade reached for the knife.
162	18	"Brittany Norwood"	October 14, 2012
An upscale store becomes a shop of horrors when a woman snaps and her co-worker is the victim of her rage.
163	19	"Kara Lounsbury"	October 21, 2012
When a beloved businessman's daughter is accused of his murder, she makes a terrible accusation of her own.
164	20	"Velma Ogden-Whitehead"	October 28, 2012
A mother schemes to save the expense of a divorce by recruiting her 16-year-old son to help end her unhappy marriage.
165	21	"Sandra Jessee"	November 11, 2012
A single slip of paper in a grandmother's purse reveals a murderer's identity seven years after a case goes cold.
166	22	"Jennifer Womac"	November 18, 2012
A doting father is shot down on his doorstep, and police find his killer too close to home for comfort.
167	23	"Shanterrica Madden"	December 2, 2012
A popular college basketball player's clash with her more studious roommate ends in tragedy.
168	24	"Mary Beth Harshbarger"	December 9, 2012
A look at the controversial case of Mary Beth Harshbarger who said she shot her husband believing he was a bear. She was acquitted of all charges.
169	25	"Mia Gonzales"	December 16, 2012
A quiet cul-de-sac became a crime scene when a domestic row between married couple Mia and Abel Gonzales ended with a gun shot.
170	26	"Tonya Ford"	January 20, 2013
A popular police officer is killed and the motive may be payback by a scorned woman.

== Season 10 (2013) ==
Snapped Season 10 episodes
No. overall	No. in season	Title	Original release date
171	1	"Teresa Stone"	January 27, 2013
A sordid secret affair between a church pastor and a lady in her congregation goes public when they both become suspects in a twisted murder.
172	2	"Jane Reth"	February 10, 2013
A college romance gets frosty when a young husband is killed. The case also goes cold - taking 22 years to solve.
173	3	"Adrienne Davidson"	February 17, 2013
A husband is brutally executed while sleeping by his wife. But he won't find much sympathy, even from his daughter, who stated: "He made his bed. Now he's lying in it."
174	4	"Amy Bishop"	February 24, 2013
People will kill to get out of some meetings. Well, one biology professor takes that to new levels when she creates a bang at a faculty meeting.
175	5	"Christine Paolilla"	March 3, 2013
Two teenage girls are found brutally murdered. Police initially suspect drugs but could the killer be one of their best friends?
176	6	"Jennifer Nibbe"	March 10, 2013
A wife comes up with an elaborate story to explain the murder of her husband. When the evidence doesn't add up, a secret boyfriend and a large insurance policy are brought into the limelight.
177	7	"Kristi Lunbery"	March 17, 2013
The truth of this case may never really be known. A woman confesses to the murder of her husband nearly ten years after his death - but was she telling the truth or was she being coerced?
178	8	"Katherine Holmes"	March 24, 2013
A woman's constant complaining about her ex-husband spurs her boyfriend into taking lethal action. But is that even enough to silence her ex?
179	9	"Tammy Cole"	March 31, 2013
An old flame is back in town hoping to rekindle the flames of a romance. But things get a bit heated when she is charged with murder and arson.
180	10	"Michelle Gaiser"	April 7, 2013
A wife finds herself under fire, not once, but three times when she is the target of multiple assassination attempts. Her husband and his mistress start pointing fingers at each other.
181	11	"Melissa Stredney"	April 14, 2013
A former college teaching assistant doesn't take bad news well when she kidnaps and shoots her ex-fiancé after he breaks off the engagement.
182	12	"Lisa Gilliam"	April 21, 2013
A wife is charged with killing her husband, an attorney with financial woes - but was it a suicide, and was she wrongly accused? This one will keep you guessing.
183	13	"Caren Pressley-Brown"	April 28, 2013
A women's rights advocate and respected business owner snaps violently during a bitter custody battle with her ex-husband and his new wife that ends in a murder plot.
184	14	"Exondia Salado"	May 5, 2013
A very grim case about an army reservist who suddenly goes missing and his temperamental wife seems to have 'cooked' up the evidence.
185	15	"Narcy Novack"	May 19, 2013
Former stripper Narcy Novack put an end to her wealthy husband's philandering when she brutally murdered him in a New York hotel room.
186	16	"Nancy Gelber"	May 26, 2013
A Texas crime novelist lets her imagination get out of hand and takes a leaf out her own book when she hires a hitman to kill her husband.
187	17	"Rebecca Sears"	June 2, 2013
There goes the neighbourhood in this episode, as a woman is brutally murdered and her neighbour is attacked. It soon emerges the two women shared more than a property line.
188	18	"Kathleen Wise"	June 16, 2013
A nurse's turbulent marriage flatlines when her husband dies from a lethal dose of liquid morphine.
189	19	"Michelle Knotek"	June 23, 2013
A woman who runs a boarding house has what can only be described as a 'killer' eviction policy in this grim episode of torture and murder.
190	20	"Elizabeth Guthrie-Nail"	June 30, 2018
A deranged ex-wife is suspected when a man is shot dead by a hitman and his new girlfriend is badly injured.
191	21	"Shellye Stark"	August 11, 2013
A former teacher puts in a plea of self-defence over the murder of her husband. But when details of her sordid secret work life as a prostitute are revealed, her plea is questioned.
192	22	"Keisha Jones"	August 18, 2013
An apparent tragic car accident that kills a lady's husband is called into question when new video evidence emerges showing that she may not be so innocent.

== Season 11 (2013–2014) ==
Snapped Season 11 Episodes
No. overall	No. in season	Title	Original release date
193	1	"Amanda Kaur"	September 1, 2013
In 2010, a mother of two from South Dakota called police to report her husband's suicide. But had he taken his life? Or had she snapped and committed murder?
194	2	"Ruby Ann Ruffolo"	September 8, 2013
The story of a Canadian woman who injected her husband with a fatal dose of heroin before loading his body into a car and leaving him in a ditch.
195	3	"Dee Dee Moore"	September 15, 2013
When a millionaire lottery winner vanishes in Florida, fingers point towards his calculating financial advisor.
196	4	"Donna Cobb"	September 22, 2013
A brutal fight in the night leaves a woman from New York fighting for both her life and her freedom.
197	5	"Melissa Cole"	September 29, 2013
The story of Melissa Cole, who was convicted of shooting her husband as he was sleeping before setting their house on fire in November 2009.
198	6	"Katey Passaniti"	October 13, 2013
A compelling look at the case of Louisiana native Katey Passaniti, who was convicted in a plot to kill her stepfather for his money.
199	7	"Laurie Jean Cone"	October 20, 2013
A deadly break-in pits mother against daughter as a television repairman is brutally killed in California.
200	8	"Lateisha Jandreau"	October 27, 2013
In North Carolina, the search for a missing man linked to bodybuilder Lateisha Jandreau leads investigators to a surprising discovery.
201	9	"Jodi Arias, Part 1"	December 15, 2013
The troubling story of the aspiring photographer who was found guilty of killing her former lover, Travis Alexander at his Arizona home in 2008.
202	10	"Jodi Arias, Part 2"	December 16, 2013
The second part of the story of the aspiring photographer who was found guilty of killing her ex-lover, Travis Alexander at his Arizona home in 2008.
203	11	"Dawn Silvernail"	December 22, 2013
Sordid secrets are revealed when a member of a church choir is murdered in Poughkeepsie. But what caused her killer to snap?
204	12	"Karen Newell"	December 29, 2013
A look at the crimes and psyche of Karen Newell, who was given life in prison for seducing her teen lover into shooting her wealthy husband in 1994.
205	13	"Jackie Postma"	January 5, 2014
Betrayal and finger pointing occur in the investigation of a murder in an isolated parking lot, which has multiple suspects.

== Season 12 (2014) ==
Snapped Season 12 episodes
No. overall	No. in season	Title	Original release date
206	1	"Rebecca Bryan"	January 12, 2014
The chilling story of an Oklahoma estate agent who cheated on her husband before putting a bullet in his head as he watched TV.
207	2	"Kalila Taylor"	January 19, 2014
The horrifying story of how a young New York woman was driven to kill by jealousy over a boyfriend she and her victim had shared.
208	3	"Alice Trappler"	January 26, 2014
The story of how a custody battle, a shooting and a suicide on the train tracks all pointed to one woman - Alice Trappler.
209	4	"Constance Clark"	March 9, 2014
The chilling story of an Atlanta woman who masterminded a plot to have her husband killed in an effort to cash in on a life insurance policy.
210	5	"Teresa Imel"	March 16, 2014
The disturbing story of Teresa Imel, who had her estranged husband Kurt killed because he wanted a divorce and she wanted the insurance money.
211	6	"Holly McFeeture"	March 23, 2014
The sinister story of an Ohio woman who was sentenced to life in prison for slowly killing the father of two of her children with antifreeze.
212	7	"Marjorie Armstrong"	March 30, 2014
The story of a botched bank robbery that turned deadly when one of the perpetrators was killed by a remotely controlled bomb fastened to his neck.
213	8	"Joanna Findlay"	March 30, 2014
The shocking story of a Scottish university lecturer who was convicted in the US of the attempted murder of her husband.
214	9	"Joann Helfrich"	April 6, 2014
A Pennsylvania woman claimed she shot her live-in boyfriend at least seven times after mistaking him for an intruder. But detectives suspected foul play.
215	10	"Marjorie Orbin"	April 13, 2014
A chilling story of sex, lies and murder centred on exotic dancer Marjorie Orbin, who murdered and dismembered her businessman husband in Arizona in 2004.

== Season 13 (2014) ==
Snapped Season 13 episodes
No. overall	No. in season	Title	Original release date
216	1	"Lupita Acuna"	April 20, 2014
The murder of a Texas man reveals a deadly love triangle and destroys two families.
217	2	"Kimberly Parker"	April 27, 2014
The story of Kimberly Parker, who was charged with planning the July 2000 kidnapping and murder of her estranged husband in order to collect his life insurance policy.
218	3	"Bernadette Perusquia"	May 4, 2014
The case of Bernadette Perusquia, a school nurse who was sentenced to life after shooting her husband. But was it self-defense or murder?
219	4	"Catherine Hamborsky"	May 11, 2014
The story of Catherine Hamborsky, who shot dead a bartender then burnt down the bar in an attempt to cover her tracks - a crime for which she was convicted in 2006.
220	5	"Tracy Lawson"	May 18, 2014
The story of Tracy Lawson, who was accused of bludgeoning her husband Andy to death with a metal pipe, and in her defense claimed he had been abusing her.
221	6	"Tina Lunney"	May 25, 2014
The story of a debt-ridden New Jersey woman who was convicted of strangling her 81-year-old mother with a necktie.
222	7	"Chyann Bratcher"	June 1, 2014
The disturbing story of a mother and daughter convicted in a 1995 murder-for-hire scheme that led to a man's drowning in Texas.
223	8	"Vonlee Nicole Titlow"	August 17, 2014
After an alcoholic millionaire dies of seemingly natural causes, an unexpected betrayal reveals there may be more to the victim's death than meets the eye.
224	9	"Rose Chase"	August 24, 2014
Ontario County woman Rose Chase, who in 2012 killed husband Adam, dismembered and destroyed his body, and lied about his whereabouts for months afterwards.
225	10	"Michele Williams"	August 31, 2014
A pretty blonde survives the attack that kills her husband. but does her story hold up?
226	11	"Colette Reyes"	September 7, 2014
The story of Colette Reyes, who pulled a gun on her college professor husband in their garage, and after shooting him dead, pleaded insanity at her trial.
227	12	"Kirstin Lobato"	September 14, 2014
A troubled small-town teen moves to Las Vegas in search of adventure, but Sin City gives her much more than she bargained for when she gets caught up in a gruesome murder.
228	13	"Robyn Davis"	September 21, 2014
Best friends band together after a husband's death, but are they sharing a deadly secret?
229	14	"Verina Childs"	September 28, 2014
The crimes of Verina Childs, who in November 2009 fatally shot husband Douglas in the back while on a hunting trip in Mississippi and him to die in the woods.
230	15	"Selena: Death of a Superstar"	October 5, 2014
When Latin pop star Selena is found bleeding to death in a hotel lobby, authorities begin to suspect that Yolanda Saldivar - her number one fan and close friend, may not have been as loyal as Selena thought.

== Season 14 (2014–2015) ==
Snapped Season 14 episodes
No. overall	No. in season	Title	Original release date
231	1	"Omaima Nelson"	November 9, 2014
When a beautiful woman's much older husband disappears under mysterious circumstances, police suspect that more than just the woman's story has been cooked up.
232	2	"Tammy Armstrong"	November 16, 2014
In a classic game of good cop bad cop, a determined detective befriends a Wisconsin woman to solve her boyfriend's suspicious disappearance.
233	3	"Whitehead Twins"	November 23, 2014
When a young mother of 16-year-old twins is found dead, investigators must delve deep into family's complicated relationship in order to unravel the mystery of her murder.
234	4	"Sandra Plunkett"	November 30, 2014
After a bedridden former police officer is executed in his own home, his wife's sordid secrets become public knowledge and turn the investigation in a surprising direction.
235	5	"Mary Ann Langley"	December 7, 2014
When a marriage ends in flames, police must determine whether it was an accident or an act of revenge.
236	6	"Mandy Smith"	December 14, 2014
When a man goes missing, the search leads police to his girlfriend and a host of secrets about their past.
237	7	"Julia Phillips"	December 21, 2014
A woman is attacked and her wealthy lover is killed - but police soon have reason to question her story, believing she knows more than she is letting on about the crime.
238	8	"Wendy Cobb"	December 28, 2014
A couple's dream home goes up in flames, but suspicions about the fire and a secret lover lead officials to ask if the wife was involved.
239	9	"Jordan Shaver"	February 8, 2015
A young woman's reconnection with a childhood crush seems like a fairy tale story in the making, but her newfound happiness may be destroyed by questions about a missing man.
240	10	"Lois Kay Cloud"	February 15, 2015
An Arizona farmer's murder goes cold as speculation mounts about his wife's secret life and the role of a mysterious con man.
241	11	"Janet Harrell"	February 22, 2015
When a man is abducted from his front yard, evidence from a taser and a strange car accident lead them to the unlikeliest of suspects.
242	12	"Pamela Phillips"	March 1, 2015
A wealthy socialite and former model becomes the main suspect behind a car bomb murder outside an exclusive country club.
243	13	"Juatasha Denton-McCaster"	March 8, 2015
The mystery of a decapitated corpse leads police to make an unlikely accusation about a college student and her missing husband.
244	14	"Shriya Patel"	March 15, 2015
An arranged marriage goes awry, but was it the husband or his immigrant wife who set a deadly fire?

== Season 15 (2015) ==
Snapped Season 15 episodes
No. overall	No. in season	Title	Original release date
245	1	"Camia Gamet"	March 22, 2015
An investigation into a horrific murder uncovers one couple's shocking history of domestic abuse and raises questions about the identity of the aggressor.
246	2	"Mindy Dodd"	March 29, 2015
The case of Mindy Dodd, who was imprisoned for shooting dead her stepfather-turned-husband - despite the fact she was not the one to pull the trigger.
247	3	"Social Media"	April 5, 2015
The stories of three women accused of committing murder, all with one thing in common - their crimes were inspired or motivated by social media.
248	4	"Marissa DeVault"	April 12, 2015
The story of Arizona woman Marissa Devault, who bludgeoned her husband with a hammer, then told the court she had suffered years of abuse at his hands.
249	5	"Ana Trujillo"	April 19, 2015
The story of Ana Trujillo, who was accused of stabbing her ex-boyfriend with her stiletto heel after a drunken argument in June 2013.
250	6	"Denise Bozarth"	July 5, 2015
The discovery of a man's murdered body on his houseboat in June 2007 - a crime for which police arrested his widow Denise Bozarth.
251	7	"Angelina Rodriguez"	July 12, 2015
The story of Angelina Rodriguez, whose husband fell victim to a sudden illness that ended in his death. But little did people know the widow was hiding a poisonous secret.
252	8	"Pamela Ballin"	July 19, 2015
A man is beaten to death in his own home, prompting police to begin searching for an intruder - unaware the culprit is much closer than they realise.
253	9	"Dianna Saunders"	July 26, 2015
The story of Dianna Saunders, who hired her ex-husband to murder her boyfriend for the insurance money.
254	10	"Kathleen Dorsett"	August 2, 2015
The case of Kathleen Dorsett, who wanted to start a new life away from her ex-husband - so involved her parents in a plot to kill him.
255	11	"Heather Horst"	August 9, 2015
The story of Heather Horst, who hired a man to shoot her husband so she could claim the life insurance.
256	12	"Judith Hawkey"	August 16, 2015
The case of Judith Hawkey, accused of persuading her 10-year-old stepson to kill his own father by shooting the man in the head.
257	13	"Gabriela Escutia"	August 23, 2015
The story of 25-year-old Gabriela Escutia, who lured her ex-boyfriend to a shopping centre where she shot him dead in a cold-blooded murder.

== Season 16 (2015–2016) ==
Snapped Season 16 episodes
No. overall	No. in season	Title	Original release date
258	1	"Yalanda Lind"	September 6, 2015
The story of Waco woman Yalanda Lind, who was sentenced to life imprisonment for stabbing her mother to death in 2008.
259	2	"Kimberly Cargill"	September 13, 2015
They say a mother's love is forever, but when a dead body is found in a small town in Texas will it have one mother facing death?
260	3	"Mary Jane Fonder"	September 20, 2015
How the members of a small Pennsylvania church were left shocked by the shooting of one of their congregation in 2008 - especially as another stood accused of the murder.
261	4	"Carmen Montelongo"	September 27, 2015
When police find a woman pushing a rubbish bin full of body parts down the street after a sudden disappearance, they have some questions to ask.
262	5	"Christine Billis"	October 4, 2015
The case of Christine Billis, who killed her husband by slamming their car into a tree in what looked like an accident - knowing that with no seatbelt on, he would never survive.
263	6	"Kristi Fulgham"	December 13, 2015
The story of how a 13-year-old confessed to murder, only for the police to suspect he was being manipulated by his half-sister.
264	7	"Cheryl Kunkle"	December 20, 2015
A murder investigation which pits a son against his mother and sheds new light on a previously unsolved death.
265	8	"Brenda Bratschi"	December 27, 2015
The discovery of the remains of a dead body under a trailer, five years after a mysterious disappearance - a case that led back to the victim's wife Brenda Bratschi.
266	9	"Brynn Hartman"	January 3, 2016
The inside story of the celebrity murder that shocked a nation, when US comedian and actor Phil Hartman was shot dead by his wife Brynn in their home in 1998.
267	10	"Michelle Despain"	January 10, 2016
The case of Michelle Despain and her father, who plotted a home invasion as a front for their murder of Michelle's husband Marc.
268	11	"Michele Williams"	January 17, 2016
Michele seemed to have a perfect life of wealth and success, until her husband is found shot in his own bed; she faces tough questions about suicide, murder and money.
269	12	"Ana Gonzalez-Angulo"	January 24, 2016
Ana Gonzalez-Angulo, the well-known breast cancer research doctor, is investigated for poisoning her lover and fellow researcher, Dr. George Blumenschein.
270	13	"Patricia Olsen"	January 31, 2016
The investigation into an apparent farm accident reveals a tangled family plot with one woman at the center - Patricia Olsen.

== Season 17 (2016) ==
Snapped Season 17 episodes
No. overall	No. in season	Title	Original release date
271	1	"Sabrina Zunich"	February 14, 2016
The brutal murder of Sabrina's foster mother raised questions about her relationship with her foster father.
272	2	"Patricia Burney"	February 21, 2016
When a bullet is found in the head of a man's body assumed to have died of natural causes, the double life of his wife and daughter is exposed.
273	3	"Maryann Castorena"	February 28, 2016
The case of Maryann Castorena, accused of paying a hitman to kill her ex-boyfriend Jose Hernandez for the life insurance money.
274	4	"Erin Everett"	March 6, 2016
Erin reports a brutal attack on her friend turned lover, but a secret relationship and allegations of abuse add a surprising twist to the investigation.
275	5	"Heather Miller"	March 13, 2016
A best friend's betrayal reveals a woman's plot to murder her husband; shocking secrets of witchcraft, poison and juicy neighbourhood affairs.
276	6	"Amber Smith"	March 20, 2016
A woman who came home to find her home ransacked and her fiancé dead in bed. But police soon suspected she knew more about the crime - after melting snow revealed a clue.
277	7	"Teresa Burousas"	June 12, 2016
After her husband is shot, Teresa sends authorities on the hunt for two gunmen but the evidence points to a killer closer to home.
278	8	"Poisonous Love"	June 19, 2016
Two stories of poisonous love, featuring a wealthy socialite and a Midwestern woman who have only one thing in common.
279	9	"Katrina Ben"	June 26, 2016
The suspicious death of Eric leaves the police asking if it was a suicide, an intruder, or if it was a girlfriend with a deadly secret.
280	10	"Lynette Pontius"	July 3, 2016
Lynette flees the country when her ex-boyfriend is shot during a custody dispute; investigators face many challenges.
281	11	"Suzanne Schoff"	July 10, 2016
Frank is gunned down; police discover a sick plot of lies and manipulation, centered on their ongoing custody battle.
282	12	"Angela Stoldt"	July 17, 2016
The gruesome 2013 stabbing and strangulation death of a limousine driver by his neighbor Angela Stoldt is investigated.
283	13	"Monique Kitts"	July 24, 2016
A successful daycare owner finds her husband dead after an alleged home invasion, but police discover a shocking double life and a murder plan full of possible accomplices.

== Season 18 (2016) ==
Snapped Season 18 episodes
No. overall	No. in season	Title	Original release date
284	1	"Shelia Eddy"	August 7, 2016
A teenager is served the ultimate betrayal by her closest friends, while her family are shocked to learn the truth about her disappearance.
285	2	"Ajelina Lewis"	August 14, 2016
Ajelina Lewis stands accused of murdering her ex-boyfriend, but she's got a cover story - was it a drug-related murder or a scorned lover pushed to the brink?
286	3	"Carol Kopenkoskey"	August 21, 2016
Tales of secrets, lies and adultery creep to the surface when a 39-year-long marriage is ended by a brutal shooting.
287	4	"Cold Cases"	August 28, 2016
The cases of two women who were suspected of committing horrific crimes against their husbands, but the cases went cold, leaving the victims' families devastated.
288	5	"Kim Long"	September 4, 2016
The case of Kim Long, who was the main suspect when her boyfriend was found beaten and stabbed to death, leaving police to prove she was the culprit.
289	6	"Giselle Esteban"	September 11, 2016
The story of Giselle Esteban, who was the prime suspect when a friendship turned into an obsessive romantic rivalry - leading to a deadly conclusion.
290	7	"Ghazal Mansury"	September 18, 2016
When her elderly mother disappeared, Ghazal Mansury blamed dementia. But as this documentary reveals, the rest of her family suspected something much more sinister happened.
291	8	"Dawn Fowler"	September 25, 2016
The story of a man who met a grisly end after getting caught up in a scandalous web of sex, lies and greed involving his ex-wife and her boyfriend.
294	9	"Loretta Burroughs"	October 9, 2016
A woman claimed her husband left her only to go missing - but the subsequent search turned up something unexpected deep in her closet.
295	10	"Donna Blanton"	October 16, 2016
The death of a state trooper leads to an all-out hunt for his killer, but the evidence points to his new wife and a big secret.
296	11	"Diane Borchardt"	October 23, 2016
An investigation into the fatal shooting of a husband of a popular teacher's aide uncovers infidelity, teenage hit men and an airtight alibi.
297	12	"Susan Walls"	October 30, 2016
A disturbing secret unravels in a family, pitting a mother against her daughter when the husband is murdered.
298	13	"Chandaliea Lowder"	November 6, 2016
The shooting of a man splits a community when the perpetrator is revealed to be a mother who thinks he sexually assaulted her daughter.

== Season 19 (2016–2017) ==
Snapped Season 19 episodes
No. overall	No. in season	Title	Original release date
299	1	"Tanasha Siena"	November 13, 2016
An argument between a couple ends in murder, but police are unsure if it was an act of self-defense or something more sinister.
300	2	"Deborah Huiett"	November 20, 2016
The investigation into the gory discovery of a woman's body in a roadside ditch, which revealed a complex love triangle and a jealousy-ridden suspect.
301	3	"Michele Donohue"	November 27, 2016
Michele Donohue claimed her husband left her for another woman. But years later, the chilling truth about his whereabouts came to light.
302	4	"Patricia MacCallum"	December 4, 2016
When a camper goes missing, fingers point to his wife as the investigation reveals marriage problems and a sinister plot.
303	5	"Shayna Hubers"	December 11, 2016
When a student kills her boyfriend the jury must decide whether it was self-defense or senseless murder as their relationship secrets are revealed.
304	6	"Shaunna Dodd"	December 18, 2016
A deadly home invasion leads to questions about a popular bartender, illegal drugs and the murder of her husband.
305	7	"Michelle Byrom"	January 8, 2017
When a man is shot, police suspects include a rebellious son and an abused wife. But it soon turns out something even more sinister may have taken place.
306	8	"Donna Scrivo"	January 15, 2017
When a man's dismembered body is found, residents of a close-knit town are floored by the possibility that the culprit could be his doting mother.
307	9	"Sarah McLinn"	January 22, 2017
A shocking murder puts a young woman at the centre of an investigation involving her boss and the possibility of multiple personalities.
308	10	"Stacey Schoeck"	January 29, 2017
The murder of a devoted family man leads investigators through a twisted tale of infidelity, betrayal and one woman's deadly plan.
309	11	"Teresa Kotomski"	February 12, 2017
A woman faces tough decisions when her husband is on life support due to a mysterious illness; the investigation uncovers whether she is a distraught wife in love or hiding a poisonous secret.
310	12	"Traci Wolfe"	February 19, 2017
The story of a woman at the centre of a twisted love triangle involving her estranged husband who ended up accused of a brutal murder.
311	13	"Judy Parker"	February 26, 2017
A business man's mysterious death sends police on a years-long investigation that leads to suspicions of those nearest and dearest to him.

== Season 20 (2017) ==
Snapped Season 20 episodes
No. overall	No. in season	Title	Original release date
313	1	"Vegas Bray"	May 14, 2017
An attractive woman witnesses her ex-boyfriend's shooting, but can't remember what happened, raising questions about suicide, stalking and split personalities.
314	2	"Shanda Crain"	May 21, 2017
When a daughter discovers her parents' dead bodies within weeks of two other family members' murders, investigators wonder if the family is being targeted or if it could be an inside job.
315	3	"Tracy Fortson"	May 28, 2017
A body is found encased in concrete, which leads to questions about a former sheriff's deputy and what her boyfriend's ties are, to law enforcement.
316	4	"Lucille Duncan"	June 4, 2017
When a body is discovered in the woods, authorities ask if he's the victim of revenge from an ex-girlfriend, her over-protective brother or her 14-year-old son.
317	5	"Tina Williamson"	June 11, 2017
A deadly shooting raises questions about an elderly man's business dealings and his friendship with a much younger woman.
318	6	"Misook Wang"	June 18, 2017
While a community searches for a missing businesswoman, police uncover a shocking dispute with a money-hungry relative that they hope will lead them to a killer.
319	7	"Whitney Harris"	June 25, 2017
A young mother tries to convince detectives she is an innocent victim when they investigate whether she had anything to do with a murderous plan.
320	8	"Diane Staudte"	July 9, 2017
They say deaths come in three, but when a young woman falls ill after eerily similar deaths of her father and brother, suspicion turns to a family member and the limits of a mother's love.
321	9	"Lisa Graham"	July 16, 2017
A woman who fell victim to a sinister plan and wound up dead. The killer was just following orders - from someone very close to home.
322	10	"Rebecca Fenton"	July 23, 2017
A woman finds her husband dead and proclaims her innocence, but questions about his wealth, a suspicious fire and her scandalous past raise red flags.
323	11	"Kwaneta Harris"	July 30, 2017
A foreclosure leads police to a concrete grave and a twisted plot of deception, fraud and murder, as one woman goes to extraordinary lengths to avoid justice.

== Season 21 (2017) ==
Snapped Season 21 episodes
No. overall	No. in season	Title	Original release date
324	1	"Eve Nance"	August 6, 2017
When a beloved Wisconsin father disappears, his wife blames drugs. However, close friends suspect a violent confrontation that ended a marriage filled with secrets.
325	2	"Martha Ann McClancy"	August 13, 2017
A churchgoing southern woman loses her husband to tragedy, but a cloud of suspicion haunts her new marriage and leads investigators to a new conclusion.
326	3	"Sandra Barajas"	August 20, 2017
Sandra and Mike Barajas has a seemingly happy marriage for 30 years, but after Mike is found dead, a criminal's confession begins to make it seem like his death was an inside job.
328	4	"Beatrice Camper"	September 3, 2017
A popular cab-driver is shot dead on the job, but the search for his killer reveals his wife's secret prison visits, a torrid affair and a possible conspiracy.
330	5	"Sandy Locklear"	September 17, 2017
The murder of a well-liked widower leaves police wondering what secrets his marriage to his new, much younger wife might be hiding.
331	6	"Michelle Paet"	September 24, 2017
A happy military family kept walls up that were soon to be knocked down. Did Michelle's husband bring his fate upon himself, or was she behind the whole thing?
332	7	"Laura Stelmasek"	October 1, 2017
Investigators try to unravel the mystery involving a couple embroiled in a cross-country romance and a deadly plan.
333	8	"Dawson McGehee"	October 8, 2017
Police discover a beloved mother of four murdered. The panic intensifies as the investigation turns into a case populated by demons, masks, and a potential psychopath on the loose.
334	9	"Eric Copple"	October 15, 2017
On Halloween night a knife-wielding intruder attacks and kills two roommates and leaves another lucky to be alive. Although the story is reminiscent to the plot of a horror film – for this California town the terror is all too real.
335	10	"Barbara Garcia"	October 22, 2017
Trick-or-treaters in a small Indiana town have no idea that the sweet grandmother passing out candy is also hiding a deadly secret in her garage.
336	11	"Daniel Clay"	October 29, 2017
After a massive Halloween bash ends with a young woman's mysterious disappearance, a tiny farming town fears that evil stalks its fields.
337	12	"Helen Moore"	November 5, 2017
Helen's boyfriend goes missing just as authorities find a dismembered torso, but the case may not be closed; 20 years later, Helen's new story could be a game changer.
338	13	"Danielle Parker"	November 12, 2017
The death of a police officer leads to a search for her killer. Is her shooting payback for an old arrest or is it much closer to home?

== Season 22 (2017–2018) ==
Snapped Season 22 episodes
No. overall	No. in season	Title	Original release date
339	1	"Emma Raine"	November 19, 2017
Detectives investigating a former soldier's death uncover a suspicious detail from his wife's past, and have to decide whether it is a tragic coincidence or something more sinister.
340	2	"Karen Sanchez"	November 26, 2017
When a missing man's body is found, his wife finds herself under a microscope, but can police prove she was involved before the case goes cold?
341	3	"Keana Barnes"	December 3, 2017
Two deceased men both helped out a damsel in distress. Did playing the good samaritan cost them their lives, and should authorities be worried that she could put someone else at risk?
342	4	"Alaina Mercer"	December 10, 2017
Devoted to raising her daughter's child, a loving grandmother is found executed in her own home. Police unfold an ongoing custody battle which leads to suspicions towards those nearest to her grandchild.
343	5	"Tameshia Shelton"	December 17, 2017
A young hunter ends up dead while hunting his own predator. Was this the case of an accidental shooting, or was there a more sinister explanation?
344	6	"Valerie Pape"	January 7, 2018
An Arizona socialite makes a gruesome discovery in a dumpster which leads local law enforcement to ask questions about her troubled marriage. She claims she found a man dead, but police have reason to believe otherwise.
345	7	"Crystal Weimer"	January 14, 2018
A young man is brutally murdered and a woman is found covered in blood just hours later. She is adamant that she is innocent, and later a twist in the case shocks everyone involved.

== Season 23 (2018) ==
Snapped Season 23 episodes
No. overall	No. in season	Title	Original release date
346	1	"Shajia Ayobi"	January 21, 2018
Does a shocking carjacking have ties to international espionage? Or will the murderer turn out to be someone much closer to home?
347	2	"Sonia Mitchell"	January 28, 2018
When a young father goes missing, authorities suspect his illegal activities, but a revelation about the mother of his children turns the investigation upside down.
348	3	"Kimberly Ross"	February 11, 2018
A generous couple opens their home to help others, but a deadly home invasion raises questions about lies and conspiracy under their roof.
349	4	"Shelly Arndt"	February 18, 2018
A deadly fire destroys a home and leaves one man dead, but investigators suspect the fire was an inside job.
350	5	"Verginia Turner"	February 25, 2018
When a prominent Californian lawyer is bludgeoned to death, police uncover a potential love triangle involving the victim's on-off girlfriend.
351	6	"Melissa Napier"	March 4, 2018
When a determined son urges police to investigate the disappearance of his father, he is met with a storm of family tragedy and betrayal.
352	7	"Joanna McElrath"	March 11, 2018
Investigators are plunged into a dark web of secrets and lies when they look into the murder of a fellow police officer.
353	8	"Joyce Sturdivant"	March 18, 2018
The death of a Texas racecar champion leads detectives down a winding road of suspects and reveals deep, dark family secrets that were hidden for decades.
355	9	"Margaret Litchfield"	April 1, 2018
When a popular construction man in a tight-knit Texas town is found gunned down in his own home, it takes police a decade and a half to track down the killer.
356	10	"Wanda Stanley"	April 8, 2018
When a Brooklyn native is found shot to death in the backseat of his car in a rough Atlanta neighborhood, police have to figure out if trouble followed him south or if the killer is in his inner circle.
357	11	"Donna Thorngren"	April 15, 2018
A mysterious shooting of a religious family man, leaves a community guessing: is this a drug-related slaying, or bloody family affair?
358	12	"Amy Van Wagner"	April 22, 2018
A quiet Wisconsin town is rocked by its first homicide in six years when an eccentric father of four is found dead in his basement.
359	13	"Eugenia Campbell"	April 29, 2018
A soldier survives two dangerous tours of duty in Iraq - but in a cruel twist of fate, he is brutally killed in his own home, by someone he knows.
360	14	"Martha Farmer"	May 6, 2018
A parking lot shooting in the dead of night leaves detectives with a long list of suspects, but all along the killer is hiding in plain sight.
363	15	"Dee Eggert"	May 20, 2018
A troubled woman turns her life around when she moves back home to the family farm. When her elderly mother disappears, police uncover a twisted web of deceit, betrayal, and forbidden romance.
364	16	"Eileen Leone"	May 27, 2018
When a charismatic father and adored member of the local youth sports community is bludgeoned to death, police must discern fact from fiction to pinpoint his murderer.
365	17	"Cindy Reese"	June 3, 2018
A small town church is stunned when a parishioner is murdered, in a stunning twist the suspect pool is drawn directly from the church walls.
366	18	"Marissa Wright"	June 10, 2018
A concerned father in Arkansas reports his son missing, launching an investigation that would unearth a dark network of lies and a horrific discovery more deadly than police ever imagined.
367	19	"Janet Tyburski"	June 17, 2018
A doting grandmother alerts police when she recognizes her daughter's dead body on the evening news, triggering an investigation that proves blood isn't always thicker than water.
368	20	"Roxanne Buck"	June 24, 2018
When authorities discover a young woman's body in a shed, they struggle to determine whether her killer is someone under her own roof or the result of an illicit affair.
369	21	"Neola Robinson"	July 1, 2018
The investigation into a missing mechanic sends Texas authorities on a wild goose chase that ceases at a dead end... until years later, when a new tip heats this cold case to a boil.
370	22	"Diana Nadell"	July 8, 2018
An affluent grandmother falls victim to an elaborate murder plot fueled by passion and greed.
372	23	"Ashley Schutt"	July 22, 2018
When a woman covered in blood shows up on her neighbor's doorstep, Georgia police commence a home invasion investigation that leads them to uncover more twists than they could have ever imagined.
373	24	"Susan Hendricks"	July 29, 2018
A tumultuous household dynamic results in the deaths of four family members... but who pulled the trigger?
374	25	"Sharon Maxwell"	August 5, 2018
Firefighters battling a vehicle fire are horrified to discover a man's charred body at the base of the flames. The ensuing investigation reveals a sinister murder plot that few in the small Texas town can fathom.
375	26	"Denise Frei"	August 12, 2018
The murder of a local café owner leads a small-town police force to uncover a diabolical scheme fueled by scandalous temptation.

== Season 24 (2018–2019) ==
Snapped Season 24 episodes
No. overall	No. in season	Title	Original release date
376	1	"Amy Fisher"	August 19, 2018
A jealous teenager's brash act of violence thrusts a shadowy affair into the national spotlight; the surviving victim, Mary Jo Buttafuoco, sheds light on her side of the scandal that rocked America.
377	2	"Angela Ferguson"	August 26, 2018
When the body of a beloved aircraft machinist is found stuffed in the trunk of his own car, investigators follow a trail of deception to a manipulative killer.
379	3	"Angelina O'Mara"	September 9, 2018
In the fall of 2011, homicide detectives in towns over two-hundred miles apart connect two separate murders to one ruthless killer.
380	4	"Julene Simko"	September 16, 2018
When the owner of an Ohio landscaping company is found shot to death in his bed, the ensuing investigation exposes an elaborate web of sex, obsession, and power.
381	5	"Jackie Ray"	September 23, 2018
A homicide investigation in Gig Harbor, Washington reveals the dark lengths one woman will go to for her family's safety.
382	6	"Diana Lovejoy"	September 30, 2018
A contentious divorce and custody battle lands one father in the crosshairs of a sniper.
383	7	"Crystal Mangum"	October 7, 2018
One of the most notorious citizens of Durham, North Carolina finds herself under scrutiny after her boyfriend is stabbed.
384	8	"Cynthia Coates"	October 14, 2018
When a man returns home from a party and finds his caregiver shot to death, detectives must sift through a complicated network of animosity and resentment to find their killer.
385	9	"Doretta Scheffield"	October 21, 2018
The murder of a benevolent owner of a landscaping business sends shockwaves through a small Ohio town.
386	10	"Carri Standsoverbull"	October 28, 2018
When a charred human torso is discovered on a Native American reservation in Montana, local and federal investigators join forces to piece together a heinous crime.
387	11	"Deborah Pieringer"	November 4, 2018
When the bodies of two grandparents are tragically found left for dead, investigators toil to determine whether the slayings were motivated by simmering vengeance or insatiable greed.
388	12	"Cynthia Mueller"	November 11, 2018
When medical examiners determine that a terminally ill Arizona man may have not died from natural causes as his family previously thought, a homicide investigation begins to unravel the truth.
389	13	"Kelly Cochran"	November 18, 2018
When a man in Michigan vanishes and another loses his life almost 400 miles away, investigators uncover a bizarre marriage pact at the centre.
390	14	"Marie Strickland"	November 25, 2018
How the investigation into the murder of a bus driver led detectives to uncover dark, hidden secrets - and bring them to a killer well known to the victim.
391	15	"Liz Golyar"	December 2, 2018
An investigation into the disappearance of an Iowa mother sends police in two states on a wild journey, during which they encounter a volatile love triangle, stolen identity, arson, and a relentless stalker intent on carrying out payback at all costs.
392	16	"Tonya Miller"	December 9, 2018
The discovery of a charred body in a burning pickup truck ignites a homicide investigation in Atlanta, Georgia.
393	17	"Ashley Hoath"	December 16, 2018
When a pair of Amish teenagers on horseback come across a man's body in a field, detectives in southern Michigan work to piece together an atrocious crime.
394	18	"Theresa Tolliver"	December 23, 2018
Two young boys are left fatherless when an Air Force sergeant is gunned down by a pair of intruders in his San Antonio home.
395	19	"Marcela Whaley"	January 6, 2019
A look into the investigation of the heinous murder of a college student in Las Vegas, which ignites an international manhunt and exposes a lethal love triangle.
396	20	"Patricia Monsell"	January 13, 2019
The murder of a New Jersey entrepreneur leaves investigators stumped... until months later, when a drug bust brings to light a murder plot riddled with greed, addiction, and betrayal.
397	21	"Teresa Rodgers"	January 20, 2019
The suspicious shooting of a delivery truck driver shrouds the Sunshine State in darkness.
398	22	"Deidra Griffin"	January 27, 2019
When the decaying body of a Baltimore man is discovered in his garage, detectives use advanced law enforcement technology to pinpoint a cunning killer.
399	23	"Constance Tomich"	February 10, 2019
The peace of an Indiana town is interrupted on Valentine's Day 2003, when police receive a report of a violent murder.
400	24	"Ana Mancio"	February 17, 2019
A delivery man gunned down in his truck in a remote area of California leads law enforcement on a bizarre investigation that uncovers an affair with tragic results.
401	25	"Kimberly Mangrum"	February 24, 2019
Investigators in Tennessee work to untangle a twisted murder plot after a mother of two is found floating in a creek.
402	26	"Donna Matthews"	March 3, 2019
While investigating a tragic murder, Wisconsin police must work their way through a complicated web, spanning across the nation, with alleged mafia ties and scandalous text messages.

== Season 25 (2019) ==
Snapped Season 25 episodes
No. overall	No. in season	Title	Original release date
403	1	"Pandora Zan"	March 10, 2019
After a home invasion in Ohio leaves a corrections officer dead, investigators use controlled calls and an undercover sting at a motel to solve the case and expose a cruel plot with a bloody ending.
404	2	"Anne Throneberry"	March 17, 2019
An investigation into the disappearance of an Arkansas couple leads a law enforcement team on a manhunt through the rugged terrain of the Ozarks and into unforeseen danger.
405	3	"Uloma Curry-Walker"	March 24, 2019
When a revered fire lieutenant is gunned down in his driveway, detectives navigate stories of a long-standing neighborhood feud and a surprise cancer scare to piece together a conspiracy plot involving young pawns manipulated by a cunning mastermind.
406	4	"Alisha Noel-Murray"	March 31, 2019
After a man is shot just a few feet inside his New York home, the ensuing investigation brings to light a murder-for-hire plot spurred by greed.
407	5	"Opal Williams"	April 7, 2019
When police searching for a missing Indiana man discover a body on a riverbank, they launch an investigation that unearths a surprising story of an open marriage and evidence of a brutal torture.
408	6	"Lisa Jones-Orock"	April 14, 2019
Police in a small Pennsylvania town respond to an eyewitness report of a murder behind a grocery store and find that the victim is no stranger to law enforcement.
409	7	"Sharon Halstead"	April 21, 2019
When a young mother is executed and her family critically injured, investigators piece together haunting clues and an earlier murder to capture deranged killers with a spiritual calling.
410	8	"Geraldine Jones"	April 28, 2019
A young mother disappears with a woman claiming to be a social worker, but the investigation into her whereabouts ends in a gruesome discovery.
411	9	"Anne Trovato"	May 5, 2019
A family recovering from one devastating loss is hit with another when a man finds his sister stabbed to death in her living room.
412	10	"Kristen Westfall"	May 12, 2019
When a newlywed couple is gunned down outside a Texas church, small town cops realize they know the victims as they uncover a murder plot fuelled by twisted family ties.
413	11	"Betty Broderick"	May 19, 2019
A powerful lawyer and his new bride are slain; detectives try to track down a scorned socialite, and they unearth twisted tales of adultery, restraining orders and alleged abuse.
414	12	"Kisha Schaberg"	May 19, 2019
A family's life is turned upside down when a ghost from their past returns for revenge.
415	13	"Hannah Stone"	May 26, 2019
When a devout single mother vanishes from her home, investigators fear she's been abducted by a group of teens hell-bent on a devilish plan... and race to find her before it's too late.
416	14	"Jerrie Bryant"	June 2, 2019
When a man goes missing in a rural small town in Tennessee, family members and detectives band together to uncover scandalous secrets fueled by greed and lust.
417	15	"Kelly Harrod"	June 9, 2019
After a beloved father vanishes, his family and the police work tirelessly for four years to find him, until a familiar witness comes forward, leading detectives to finally expose a diabolical conspiracy which may have been paid for by sexual favors.
418	16	"Jordan Graham"	June 16, 2019
When the body of a newlywed is spotted at the base of a cliff in Glacier National Park, local and federal authorities join forces for an investigation that will put their skills to the ultimate test.
419	17	"Karri Willoughby"	June 23, 2019
After a well-known saddle maker passes away from an apparent heart attack, police find reason to question the natural death after rumors about drugs and embezzlement come to light.
420	18	"Cindy McKay"	June 30, 2019
The discovery of a victim's burning body disrupts the peace one February night and puts investigators on the trail of an elusive criminal whose desire for financial gain led to murder.
421	19	"Nanette Litherland"	July 7, 2019
When a household is targeted by gunfire twice in a short amount of time, investigators in rural Missouri sift through a community in search of a family's enemies which leads them to a mastermind pulling strings.
422	20	"Jasmine Harlee"	July 14, 2019
An investigation into the mysterious death of a loving mother leads authorities to uncover a diabolical plot hatched close to home.
423	21	"Melissa Patterson"	July 21, 2019
After an endearing World War II veteran and family man is laid to rest from apparent natural causes, a surprise witness surfaces with murder accusations, sparking a police investigation into a devious predator.
424	22	"Theresa Voss"	July 28, 2019
When a body is discovered in the trunk of a burning car, police in Ohio sift through the ashes for clues; as the years slip by without an arrest, the killer may have evaded capture.
425	23	"Judy Flanagan"	August 4, 2019
The discovery of a body in a wildlife management area launches a murder investigation that forces a group of friends into the hot seat. When police think they find a surprising clue and possible hidden message the case breaks wide open.
426	24	"Rebecca Braswell"	August 11, 2019
An investigation into the murder of a military hero tests the bonds of military camaraderie and unravels a myriad of secrets, lies, and hidden identities.
427	25	"Pamela Lanier"	August 18, 2019
A woman's innocence is called into question after her husband dies from a mysterious malady and encourages detectives to take a deep dive into her past.
428	26	"Georgia Watson"	August 25, 2019
When a man is ambushed by a firestorm of bullets outside his home, investigators follow a twisted trail of suspects to a vindictive mastermind.

== Season 26 (2019–2020) ==
Snapped Season 26 episodes
No. overall	No. in season	Title	Original release date
429	1	"Kathryn Briggs"	September 1, 2019
A decorated soldier falls in love with a beautiful model online. Tragically, after he returns home from serving two tours overseas, he's brutally murdered in his own home.
430	2	"Beverly McColm"	September 8, 2019
Police discover a philanthropic entrepreneur shot dead in his home. A surprise visit from a stranger attending his funeral takes detectives down an unexpected path to reveal a sweet, yet deceptive killer.
431	3	"Nancy Khan"	September 15, 2019
An investigation into the murder of a successful business manager and expecting father leads Texas detectives to a seedy underworld and a spiteful killer.
432	4	"Debra Dillard"	September 22, 2019
A young mother of two on her way to a birthday party is gunned down on the side of a rural highway. The ensuing investigation reveals fraying within a tight-knit family.
433	5	"Janice Dodson"	September 29, 2019
A newlyweds hunting trip becomes lethal when a woman finds her husband shot dead, sending investigators to track a muddy trail of bullet holes, deception, and dirty laundry left by a devious murderer.
434	6	"Frances Truesdale"	October 6, 2019
The 1988 roadside murder of a man in Virginia sends investigators down a path fraught with doubts and dead ends, until a long-buried secret is unearthed hundreds of miles away revealing decades old secrets.
435	7	"Deborah Perna"	October 13, 2019
When a man is found shot to death on a suburban street, a wild investigation commences, featuring a high-speed car chase, dangerous gang members and a twisted murder plot that betrays family loyalties.
436	8	"Cynthia Alvarez"	October 20, 2019
As Halloween approaches in southern California, a family of three mysteriously goes missing. During their search for answers, investigators unearth a haunting message that points to murder.
437	9	"William Dennis"	October 27, 2019
A horrific murder of a young mother on Halloween night sends California investigators on the hunt for a costumed killer.
438	10	"Tyler Block-Patton"	November 2, 2019
A welfare check on a local real-estate tycoon reveals a gruesome murder scene. Investigators must sift through alleged drug use, revenge, and a case of mistaken identity to uncover a bombshell of a killer.
439	11	"Valerie Nessler"	November 3, 2019
When a deadly rumor is stirred up among friends and acquaintances, it sets off an explosion of brutal violence so gruesome that not even a house fire can hide the truth.
440	12	"Brandy Stutzman"	November 10, 2019
The murder of a U.S. Airman leads Las Vegas investigators down a twisted path to one woman's offbeat oasis and ties to an unusual fan club.
441	13	"Hazelynn Stomps"	November 17, 2019
After a woman reports that she and her husband were attacked by a pair of assailants, authorities in Oregon launch an investigation into the crime and unravel a complex scheme.
442	14	"Hope Schreiner"	November 24, 2019
Investigators examine the sudden and violent murder of a retired landscape architect as they weed through information about a disgruntled neighbor and an illicit affair.
443	15	"Behind Bars: Sheila Davalloo"	December 1, 2019
Convicted murderer Sheila Davalloo tells her story in a prison interview; includes a look at the crimes that put her behind bars, details from her past and a possible connection to a cold case.
444	16	"Jennifer Morrisey"	December 8, 2019
When a concerned co-worker discovers a man executed in his home in a well to do neighborhood police are sent down a winding road of greed, drugs, and heartbreak to uncover a spiteful murderer.
445	17	"Stephanie Olson"	December 15, 2019
After a single mother is found murdered in her Kentucky home, detectives must follow a twisted trail littered with lies to identify the mastermind behind this vicious killing.
446	18	"Tracie Miles"	December 22, 2019
When a Kansas mother is discovered brutally murdered in her own home, investigators fear that her missing teenage daughter has met a similar fate. They scour the area for clues until rumors guide them to an unlikely mastermind.
447	19	"The Case Continues: The Death of Selena"	December 29, 2019
We revisit the case and trial of Yolanda Saldivar, who was convicted of murdering pop star sensation Selena in 1995. A new claim from Yolanda hit the spotlight in March 2019, which could have a major effect on her sentencing.
448	20	"Helen Frazier"	January 5, 2020
When an apparent slam dunk murder investigation becomes muddied by intricate stories, police discover their star witness is much closer to the murderer than they were initially led to believe.
449	21	"Betty Neumar"	January 12, 2020
The cold-case shooting of a Norwood, North Carolina man leaves his family shattered and without answers. After two decades pass the investigation resumes only to uncover mysterious deaths spanning a half-century.
450	22	"Susan Baker"	January 19, 2020
When the body of a well-known mechanic is found floating in a Tennessee river, police unearth evidence that leads them to a ruthless killer fuelled by addiction and greed.
451	23	"Lorraine Hunter"	January 26, 2020
After a truck driver is found shot to death in the cab of his semi-truck, homicide detectives in California follow a trail of deceit to uncover a ruthless killer who will stop at nothing to walk free.
452	24	"Pamela Hupp"	February 9, 2020
A mother is found dead, another woman targeted at home, two mysterious crimes tied together with a shocking common ground. Excessive pride proves to be the downfall of one sinful perpetrator trying to preserve their reputation.
453	25	"Joy Aylor"	February 16, 2020
After the brutal attack of a single mother in her own home, authorities work for two decades to uncover an unlikely criminal who uses the power of lust as a deadly weapon.
454	26	"Sahara Fakhir"	February 23, 2020
When a beloved family man is found brutally murdered in his home, authorities must follow a trail of clues that exposes a strange and unlikely killer guided by gluttonous urges that led to murder.
455	27	"Kristen Durgan"	March 1, 2020
The disappearance of a devoted father reveals a treasure trove of family secrets and exposes a twisted plot driven by greed.

== Season 27 (2020) ==
Snapped Season 27 episodes
No. overall	No. in season	Title	Original release date
456	1	"Jaclyn Martin"	March 8, 2020
When Jaclyn Martin's life of comfort is jeopardized, she orchestrates the killing of her husband, a beloved neighborhood bar owner.
457	2	"Kimberly Baldwin"	March 15, 2020
Indiana investigators learn just how manipulative and deadly a person's envy can be, when a devoted father is found violently murdered in his own home.
458	3	"Carleen Charlie"	March 22, 2020
After a wrathful killer strikes a small Alaskan village, investigators must untangle a truly twisted romance to find out what led to this rage-filled stabbing.
459	4	"Rebecca Smith"	March 29, 2020
When the half-dressed, partially frozen body of a Navy veteran is found lying in a ditch, rumors and lies will challenge detectives' efforts to lay bare the truth behind the chilling death.
460	5	"Judith Singer"	April 5, 2020
After a young California father is ambushed on the steps of his own home, Santa Clara detectives uncover a complex murder plot that ultimately leads them to an unexpected mastermind who's been hiding in plain sight all along.
461	6	"Jamie Grachek"	April 12, 2020
A home invasion quickly turns fatal on Easter night, and as Ohio authorities work to find the assailant, they discover that the attack may not have been as random as first thought.
463	7	"Kayla Nelson"	April 26, 2020
An investigation into the disappearance of a devoted father leads Arkansas police to a shocking crime scene, the search for answers reveals gang threats, and a killer that's willing to go to great lengths to escape justice.
464	8	"Sylvia White"	May 3, 2020
When a prominent insurance salesman is gunned down on a country road in Kinston, North Carolina, a 20-year-old secret comes to light and casts a shadow on a killer's flawless reputation.
465	9	"Wendi Mae Davidson"	May 10, 2020
When an airman from Lee, Maine vanishes only four months into his marriage to a country girl from West Texas, it triggers a multi-agency investigation that exposes a darker side to southern hospitality.
466	10	"Blanche Taylor Moore"	May 17, 2020
When a small town preacher is hospitalized with a mysterious illness, North Carolina police uncover a string of suspicious deaths all centered around a Burlington woman with a hidden dark side.
467	11	"Mary Bruno"	May 24, 2020
The peaceful life of a retired North Carolina couple is shattered when a husband's body is found in his own garage, leaving investigators to sort out fact from fiction with the help of his wife.
468	12	"Marie Hilley"	May 31, 2020
After a bizarre account of suspected false identity is reported, authorities uncover a long history of an evasive criminal and launch a nationwide hunt to catch a killer who uses Southern charm as a weapon of deception.
469	13	"Suze Adams"	June 7, 2020
A hardworking mother is trapped and killed in a California house fire. Investigators sift through multiple theories to figure out who could have ignited the deadly blaze.
470	14	"Sarah Vercauteren"	June 14, 2020
As Pennsylvania police investigate the gruesome murder of a grandmother in her own home, detectives sort through a webs of lies and nefarious activities before ultimately going toe to toe with a cold-blooded killer.
471	15	"Cynthia Phillips"	June 21, 2020
After a family man is gunned down on the side of the road in a small Texas town, detectives unearth a perpetrator who's hiding more than one shocking skeleton in their closet.
472	16	"Nena Bolton"	June 28, 2020
Small town McNeil, Arkansas is grief-stricken after a retired Sheriff's Deputy is suddenly shot to death, but just when the case appears to be closed, a killer strikes again and another local hero is struck down.
473	17	"Dayna Jennings"	July 5, 2020
When a beloved grandfather in Federal Heights, Colorado vanishes without a trace, the ensuing investigation exposes disturbing secrets that were lurking behind closed doors as police body cam footage reveals the deadly truth.
474	18	"Janice Bonnell"	July 12, 2020
Sleepy Seadrift, Texas is unnerved by the death of a local landscaper after evidence at the scene of an apparent hit-and-run points to a deceptive killer with a dangerous past.
475	19	"Annette Cahill"	July 19, 2020
The deadly beating of a young man in West Liberty, Iowa sits unsolved for twenty-five years, until cold case detectives are approached by an unexpected witness.
476	20	"Olicia Lee"	July 26, 2020
A former ladies man's body is found floating in a creek, and detectives suspect that there's more to his latest relationship than meets the eye.
477	21	"Maria Hernandez"	August 2, 2020
The American Dream for a hard-working immigrant is suddenly cut short, when he is violently murdered with a hatchet in the streets of a Las Vegas suburb.
478	22	"Thomas Gilbert, Jr."	August 9, 2020
An investigation into the murder of a New York business man zeroes in on a family member unwilling to give up their plush lifestyle launching a tabloid frenzy. A closer look reveals the suspect's inner demons calling the greedy motive into question.
479	23	"Cindy Campbell Ray"	August 16, 2020
When a successful Texas lawyer and his wife are executed while sleeping in their bed, Houston police team up with a private investigator, who gets dangerously close to a killer, to uncover a greedy mastermind who proves that privilege can be deadly.
480	24	"William Rouse"	August 23, 2020
The truth behind the brutal deaths of a prominent and wealthy couple in Libertyville, IL, remains dormant until 15 years later, when a new police task force exposes a murderer that let money remove their sense of consequence.
481	25	"Sante Kimes"	August 30, 2020
The mysterious disappearance of an elderly New York socialite is the catalyst for the nationwide investigation into an unusual con duo, who treasure a luxurious way of life above all else, resulting in one of the biggest cases New York has ever seen.

== Season 28 (2020–2021) ==
Snapped Season 28 episodes
No. overall	No. in season	Title	Original release date
482	1	"Karina Rafter"	September 6, 2020
While investigating the tragic murder of a devoted father in Virginia, detectives must work their way through several disturbing theories and contentious family dynamics to get to the heart-breaking truth.
483	2	"Barbara Cameron"	September 13, 2020
Death hits close to home when a Mississippi father of four is brutally killed on his own front porch. Soon a mother and son turn against one another as detectives work to untangle a murky tale of "he said she said" to close in on a killer.
484	3	"Celestine Payne"	September 20, 2020
The identity of a Jane Doe found dead in a New Jersey park holds the key to unravelling a tangled web of fraud and murder that spanned years and pulled in multiple victims along the way.
485	4	"Wanda Haithcock"	September 27, 2020
When the body of a beloved father is discovered abandoned in a South Carolina home, detectives uncover a toxic love affair with deadly consequences.
486	5	"Letti Strait"	October 4, 2020
Questions about a Kansas City man's ties to the mafia are raised when he is found shot to death in his own home, but a closer inspection reveals a spiteful killer with a more personal connection.
487	6	"Linda Culbertson"	October 11, 2020
After a successful attorney is brutally murdered outside of his own office, investigators uncover a maze of obsession and jealousy that leads to a scornful perpetrator.
488	7	"Debra Henderson"	October 18, 2020
A shot at love brings an Oklahoma woman to rural Texas, but her quick disappearance has investigators following a paper trail that will expose the treachery of greed.
489	8	"Nancy Siegel"	October 25, 2020
After a John Doe is found murdered at a Virginia park, investigators spend seven years unravelling the truth behind a killer with a decade-long history of deception and fraud.
490	9	"Jerrie Lynn Acklin"	November 1, 2020
The mysterious disappearance of a beloved nurse leads Arkansas investigators down a twisted path of familial betrayal. As detectives hunt for the missing woman, evidence upturned along the way points toward deadly foul play.
491	10	"Christine Roush"	November 8, 2020
The body of an unidentified female is found within a forested nature center in Bloomington, Illinois. Investigators must scramble to piece together her fractured life and try to determine just how familiar her killer may be.
492	11	"Laurie Bembenek"	November 15, 2020
One woman's innocence is called into question when a mother of two is found deceased in a Milwaukee home. However, the controversial case is far from buttoned up, when years later, new evidence comes to light...that changes everything.
493	12	"Dana Flynn"	November 22, 2020
The twisted story of a heinous murder plot in Kansas, rife with betrayal and deceit. In an exclusive interview with someone personally involved in the crime, hear a riveting account of the deadly scheme.
494	13	"Sandra Jonas"	November 29, 2020
When an Idaho family returns home from a church gathering, they find dinner burned to a crisp, a missing fiancée, and unique signs of a brutal crime. All leads point close to home when detectives begin their investigation.
495	14	"Debra Hartmann"	December 6, 2020
A 14-year-old girl discovers her wealthy father brutally executed in their home late at night. The investigation proves that not everything is as it seems, discovering love affairs, possible connections to the mob and a twisted journey to justice.
496	15	"Rose Kuehni"	December 13, 2020
A close-knit family starts a search for their brother after he fails to show up at Thanksgiving dinner. As investigators dig deeper they realize his recent online presence may be a charade conducted by a jealous killer.
497	16	"Princess LaCaze"	December 20, 2020
When the last real cowboy is found dead at home, detectives dig in and are hard pressed to find anyone who'd want to see this loving father murdered. But a closer look at his nearest confidants unravel a heinous plot twisted by love and money.
498	17	"Donna Trapani"	December 27, 2020
After a beloved town librarian is gunned down, investigators discover that this murder-for-hire gives a whole new meaning to a broken heart.
498	18	"Virginia Hyatt"	January 3, 2021
When a Texarkana square dancer is gunned down on the steps of her palatial home, detectives follow a murky trail of surveillance footage leading straight to a killer with a taste for revenge.
499	19	"Janeene Jones"	January 10, 2021
Allegations of real estate fraud and rumors of murder have Sarasota Police on the tail of a criminal whose final plan to evade trouble lands her in the very hands she tried to avoid.
500	20	"Carol Carlson"	January 17, 2021
When a Kapowsin, Washington mother is discovered murdered on her couch in a compromised position, investigators must piece together all the evidence to determine if this was a random crime of opportunity or a façade to humiliate the victim.
501	21	"Minnie Salinas"	January 24, 2021
Police race for answers after an adored school teacher is found dead in her San Antonio apartment. A string of lies and betrayal comes to light, but when the case goes cold, one detective refuses to give up.
502	22	"Debra Banister"	January 31, 2021
When two sisters' husbands turn up dead within weeks of each other, Florida detectives investigate whether the cases are a tragic coincidence...or if they're related by something other than blood.
503	23	"Lynn Boyd"	February 21, 2021
After a well-known business owner is found dead in his Lake Orion apartment, investigators are left untangling a web of lies to uncover a deadly duo looking to get rich quick.
504	24	"Latoya Woodard"	March 7, 2021
When a devoted father is found brutally stabbed to death in his Deltona, Florida, home, detectives turn their focus to the picture perfect family who appeared to have it all.
505	25	"Mary Ann Bragg"	March 14, 2021
After a Georgia father is discovered bludgeoned by a hammer in his own bedroom, it takes years for detectives to nail down if this murder is connected to a series of online romances or a case of mistaken identity.
506	26	"Jennifer Clark"	March 21, 2021
When a hard-working man goes missing without a trace in rural Barnesville, Georgia, investigators race against the clock to find if he has disappeared on his own volition or if something much more sinister has happened.

== Season 29 (2021) ==
Snapped Season 29 episodes
No. overall	No. in season	Title	Original release date
507	1	"Porsche Humphery"	April 4, 2021
When a well-liked young man in Milwaukee is found shot to death inside his locked home, detectives must piece together his final days through a network of friends and lovers to expose a killer's desire to kill what they couldn't keep.
508	2	"Susan Monica"	April 11, 2021
While investigating a missing Oregon handyman, police stumble upon human remains and are left searching a stunning crime scene straight out of a horror movie.
509	3	"Gail Gash"	April 18, 2021
After detectives discover a beloved fire chief's dismembered torso in his own barn, they must rush to find his missing wife—are they both victims, or is this couple hiding dark secrets?
510	4	"Samantha Wohlford"	April 25, 2021
When a young Texas father is abducted without a trace and later found murdered, Titus County investigators follow a leery trail of cell phone records and internet history to reveal a dangerous conspiracy fueled by a manipulative mastermind.
511	5	"Crystal Gregoire"	May 2, 2021
Investigators must determine if they are looking for professional killer, or if they are being told lies from someone in the victim's inner circle, when a Tennessee man who was rumored to have connections with the mob is murdered.
512	6	"Karen Clowers"	May 9, 2021
When a loving wife of a Vietnam veteran is found dead in a highway commuter lot, Missouri detectives work to chase down the mastermind of a twisted murder-for-hire plot.
513	7	"Mary Jacoby"	May 16, 2021
After a soon-to-be-wed scrapyard owner is killed, Texas detectives must chase down every lead and conduct hundreds of interviews in order to find the truth hidden behind lies, betrayal and broken hearts.
514	8	"Francine Stepp"	May 23, 2021
When an Oklahoma teen finds her mother and father murdered in their family home, detectives uncover bizarre photos and use new technology to reveal a dynamic duo at the center of the heinous crime.
515	9	"Deborah Rudibaugh"	May 30, 2021
The abrupt disappearance of a Colorado rancher prompts concerned friends to press investigators to dig up the truth hidden beneath his ranch's calm exterior.
516	10	"Rachel Kozloff"	June 6, 2021
When a beloved biker is found shot to death in his Pennsylvania apartment, detectives track down leads from rival biker clubs to scorned lovers to uncover the truth.
517	11	"Angela Dickinson"	June 13, 2021
On the same day his wife is giving birth, an Alabama trucker is found shot in his own home and as Investigators uncover a sinister web of lies, they discover the ultimate betrayal.
518	12	"Eunice Cristina Rodriguez"	June 20, 2021
After a woman discovers her brother's brutally beaten body on his bathroom floor, Texas police follow clue after clue and weave together a tale of greed, deception and manipulation.
519	13	"Rosalina Edmondson"	June 27, 2021
As investigators search for the vicious killer of a Navy yeoman in Kitsap, Washington, they come across the troubling realization that the victim may have expected his own demise.
520	14	"Shirley Jo Phillips"	July 11, 2021
An elderly woman's body is found dismembered along a rural road, sending Missouri detectives in search of answers. How could this loving grandmother meet such a horrific end? What's finally uncovered is a master manipulator with a list of victims.
522	15	"Clara Rector"	July 18, 2021
After a beloved Missouri barfly is found stabbed in his home, detectives spend years chasing down leads until a local pastor reveals a shocking confession from one of his parishioners, revealing a twisted desire and deadly secret kept for years.
524	16	"Pamela Moss"	July 25, 2021
When a prominent businessman goes missing, Georgia investigators race against the clock to locate him, uncovering a killer who will go to any lengths necessary to stay hidden.
525	17	"Brenda Delgado"	August 1, 2021
Dallas detectives are led on an international manhunt after a young dentist is shot to death at her apartment complex, leaving a trail of surveillance evidence and a deep conspiracy of lies.
526	18	"Becky Machetti"	August 8, 2021
After small-town newlyweds are found gunned down next to their car, Georgia detectives start a multistate investigation and discover just how far a criminal trio will go to prove itself.
527	19	"Jennifer Paeyeneers"	August 15, 2021
Oklahoma detectives must untangle a twisted love triangle to discover the truth after a young man is shot in his own home.
528	20	"Jenea Chance"	August 22, 2021
An ordinary August day turns into a nightmare for the Bakersfield community when a local father is found murdered in a field; police are led down an unusual trail of evidence, leading to a killer caught on camera.
529	21	"Dawn Houck"	August 29, 2021
When a young, father-to-be is found murdered in his front yard in Florida, investigators chase down multiple leads and track a trail of deceit to bring a jealous killer to justice.
530	22	"Candie Zito"	September 5, 2021
When the body of a young man is discovered burned beyond recognition, Alabama authorities sift through evidence to track down the unlikely couple at the center of this heinous crime.
531	23	"Denise Davidson"	September 12, 2021
A beloved pediatric doctor is beaten and drowned in his own home; when detectives surveil a suspect, the waters are muddied by lies, suspects on the run, and an international manhunt.
532	24	"Delma Troy"	September 19, 2021
All leads run dry after a former film star is found shot to death in his home, but as investigators continue hunting down a suspect, they learn that this Hollywood drama has more twists and turns than any blockbuster hit.
533	25	"Stephanie Thomas"	September 26, 2021
The abrupt disappearance of a Henderson, Nev., husband and father of five brings to light accusations of infidelity and cover-ups over a two-year hunt for evidence and truth.
534	26	"Karen Smallwood"	October 3, 2021
The sudden and violent death of a young teenage mom in Santa Fe uncovers a love triangle and while detectives have multiple suspects in their grasp, they are taken aback when the true murderer shows their face on camera.

== Season 30 (2021-2022) ==
Snapped Season 30 episodes
No. overall	No. in season	Title	Original release date
535	1	"Angel Brown"	October 10, 2021
After a father's life is tragically cut short in a car accident, the events that follow force Ohio investigators to race against the clock to prevent a murder-for-hire plot before it's too late.
536	2	"Mary Ann Hughes"	October 17, 2021
An investigation quickly turns cold in rural Tennessee when the body of a small-town farmer and businessman is found near a trash pile; the case is reopened 25 years later, hoping advances in technology will finally help close this cold case.
537	3	"Tucker Moore-Reed"	October 24, 2021
When a family dispute turns violent and results in the death of an Oregon man, detectives must sort through a cast of characters to uncover the leading lady at the center of the crime.
538	4	"Linda Dancer"	October 31, 2021
The case of a beloved Kenosha social worker's murder resurfaces nearly a decade after leads run dry when an odd call from another state reveals the gruesome truth about a vengeful pack of killers.
539	5	"Theresa Ramirez"	November 7, 2021
When a beloved plastic surgeon and his office manager are gunned down at work, detectives chase down several leads until they uncover one suspect hiding malicious intent.
540	6	"Lori Isenberg"	November 14, 2021
The search for a missing boater on Lake Coeur d'Alene turns sinister after a local newspaper uncovers a shocking story, forcing residents of the peaceful lake town to question their neighbors.
541	7	"Daisy Gutierrez"	November 21, 2021
A haunting text message leaves the family of a missing young man desperate for answers; as Chicago detectives work through multiple theories, they eventually unearth the shocking truth to his sudden disappearance.
542	8	"Claudia Hoerig"	November 28, 2021
After an Air Force pilot is found shot to death in his Ohio home, authorities embark on an international manhunt that spans over a decade to bring the fugitive to justice.
543	9	"Ciera Harp"	December 5, 2021
Just as detectives investigating the death of an Atlanta based rapper are closing what appears to be a domestic dispute case, they are faced with horrifying evidence planted by the victim seconds before his death.
544	10	"Lisa Dolph Hostetter"	December 12, 2021
When a young woman is found mysteriously gunned down off a remote highway, Michigan detectives look into the victim's past for answers, uncovering a scandalous web of infidelity and betrayal.
545	11	"Melanie Eam"	December 19, 2021
The investigation of a young gamer's murder begins with his mother's heartbreaking 911 call but when detectives find a clue inside evidence left at the crime scene, the case turns into a multi-state search for a heartbroken suspect.
546	12	"Sheila Graham-Trott"	December 26, 2021
After a psychic dream leads detectives in Florida to the body of a missing nurse, the ensuing investigation uncovers a series of brutal betrayals exposing a vengeful killer fueled by jealousy.
547	13	"Sarah Mitchell"	January 2, 2022
When a firebomb attack destroys the home of two sisters, police turn to the neighborhood for answers, but the high-profile case takes an odd turn once detectives realize they have a homicide on their hands and the culprit is much closer to home.
549	14	"Anne Plue Gates"	January 9, 2022
The brutal murder of an Arabi, Louisiana man force authorities to examine every possible lead as they eventually learn their prime suspect is closely tied to an open cold case in Indiana.
550	15	"Candy Montgomery"	January 16, 2022
Investigators work to uncover the truth behind a local church scandal in order to pin down a most unlikely suspect after a young Texas teacher is found axed to death on Friday the 13th.
551	16	"Marlene Johnson"	January 23, 2022
When a beloved woman in North Carolina is found stabbed to death in her own home, investigators uncover an unnerving history of harassment carried out by a killer blinded by jealousy.
552	17	"Shelly Harmon"	January 30, 2022
The body of a teen is found at a local party spot and theories surrounding her death spread, but the case goes cold for 30 years, until the investigation heats back up.
553	18	"Priscilla Matula"	February 6, 2022
Authorities are puzzled when a beloved Georgia grandmother is shot execution style, but as the investigation unfolds, a once close-knit family turns against itself.
554	19	"Gloria Aiken"	February 20, 2022
After leads dry up in a missing person case, detectives in Ennis, Texas, discover a severed body part at a nearby lake; after confirming the DNA match, they begin to uncover the rippling relationship that led to the death of a beloved father.
555	20	"Barbara Burns"	February 27, 2022
After the deceased body of a St. Petersburg, Fla., woman is found in an abandoned trailer, investigators search for answers and uncover the dark truth of what happens when someone is pushed too far.
556	21	"Patricia Brown"	March 6, 2022
Robbery seems to be a plausible motive when a North Carolina man is found shot to death in a roadside ditch, but the case remains cold for years until a mysterious letter reveals a more sinister motive than anyone could have imagined.
557	22	"Dephne Wright"	March 13, 2022
Authorities are left stunned when stories of mysticism and conspiracy come to the front while they investigate the disturbing murders of an elderly Vietnamese couple in Texas.
558	23	"Patty James"	March 20, 2022
Wilton Manors, Fla., investigators search for motives after a beloved father is found strangled and battered in his driveway, until an unsuspected confession reveals a complex web of deceit.
559	24	"Karen Coleman"	March 27, 2022
After the burned body of a local man is found in rural Missouri, the homicide goes unsolved for nearly two decades until a twisted murder plot is brought to light.
560	25	"Angela McCraw-Hester"	April 3, 2022
Investigators in Gresham, Ore., are left with a gruesome crime scene, an assailant on the loose and a missing child after the victim of a stabbing is able to call 911 in a last attempt to save her own life.
561	26	"Sheila Aidoo"	April 10, 2022
When two Ghanaian immigrants are discovered murdered in their upscale Maryland home, police are confronted with bizarre evidence that motivates them to take a closer look at the mystifying rituals of voodoo.

== Season 31 (2022) ==
Snapped Season 31 episodes
No. overall	No. in season	Title	Original release date
562	1	"Shirley Nelson"	July 17, 2022
When a prominent Santa Rosa, Calif., couple is found gunned down at the offices of one of the world's most popular cartoons, detectives are left to untangle the inner workings of a decades-long marriage.
563	2	"Catherina Voss"	July 24, 2022
A picture-perfect Navy family is shattered when the father is found shot to death after returning home from deployment; detectives are led to believe the crime is a tragic coincidence until a dark plan devised from lust and greed comes to light.
564	3	"Joann Peterson"	July 31, 2022
When a father in Spokane, Wash., is found shot to death in his vehicle, detectives work for years to unmask a vicious killer who isn't afraid to silence witnesses; they eventually uncover a long-kept family secret that breaks the case wide open.
565	4	"Angelina Hamrick"	August 7, 2022
After an Air Force recruiter is found dead in a ditch near his Ohio home, authorities chase down several leads until the case culminates with a sting operation worthy of an international spy drama.
566	5	"Susan Gigliotti"	August 14, 2022
After gunshots ring out in rural New Jersey, police discover a beloved father shot to death and a vehicle taken from the premises; investigators must determine if this is a random act of violence or a murder plot spun from an ongoing dispute.
567	6	"Angel Sawyer"	August 21, 2022
After a local antique shop owner is murdered in a seemingly random home invasion, North Carolina police discover there is more to the story when a web of lies and infidelity are revealed.
568	7	"Willa Blanc"	August 28, 2022
A retired nuclear physicist is reported missing and investigators discover he lived a reclusive life fueled by paranoia, but as detectives race to find him, they begin to wonder whether his fears were unfounded or if his worst nightmare came true.
569	8	"Rebecca Barker"	September 4, 2022
A general store owner in Rusk, Texas, calls 911 and makes a harrowing confession, but as detectives dig deeper, they discover a disturbing pattern making them rethink the motivation behind the crime.
570	9	"Carter Cervantez"	September 11, 2022
An early morning apartment fire in Fort Worth, Texas, sparks a murder investigation when a young woman's body is found beaten and bound inside; detectives quickly work to solve the case and uncover an elaborate plot fueled by revenge and greed.
571	10	"Irenia Cotner"	September 18, 2022
After a mother and son are brutally attacked during a home invasion, Illinois police chase down several leads; they uncover a shocking motive with an occult leader and her loyal followers at the center of the crime.
572	11	"Kimberly Kessler"	September 25, 2022
When a beloved mother goes missing on her birthday, detectives are faced with several possible suspects before focusing on a co-worker with a shocking past who will do anything to hide their true identity.
573	12	"April Quick"	October 2, 2022
After a small-town man is found shot to death at a Missouri roadside park, the evidence trail leads detectives further into the man's complicated past where they uncover a wicked plot that no one saw coming.
574	13	"Sheila LaBarre"	October 9, 2022
Police follow a lead in a missing persons investigation to a 115-acre farm, unearthing the site of a gruesome crime and a seductive killer that will go down in New Hampshire history.
575	14	"Amber Andrews"	October 16, 2022
A loving father agrees to give his ex-wife a chance to reconcile; when his loved ones can't reach him, an unexpected tip is brought to Oklahoma police that uncovers a toxic love triangle and horrific crime scene.
576	15	"Teresa Kohnle"	October 23, 2022
When a beloved family man dies in a house fire, his wife and children must grapple with his unexpected loss.
577	16	"Sherra Wright"	October 30, 2022
When a professional basketball star is gunned down in his hometown of Memphis, Tenn., the case goes cold for nearly a decade; after a new team of investigators takes over, it uncovers the missing murder weapon and a mastermind close to home court.
578	17	"Judy Naylor"	November 6, 2022
A 62-year-old man bails his stepdaughter out of jail for attempted murder and is soon found dead, but investigators learn his death may not be what it seems.
579	18	"Purdie Clark"	November 13, 2022
Texas Rangers are brought in to investigate the most recent death when a San Angelo, Texas, woman loses three romantic partners in the span of three years.
580	19	"Hilma Marie Witte"	November 20, 2022
Years after a beloved father is accidentally shot in his home, the family matriarch mysteriously vanishes; as a second investigation launches, a shocking confession reveals a family secret about how far a son is willing to go for his mother.
581	20	"Megan Hargan"	November 27, 2022
A frantic 911 call in an upscale neighborhood leads police to the bodies of a mother and daughter in what appears to be a murder-suicide; investigators discover a trail of deceit that exposes an unexpected killer.
582	21	"Aria Armstead"	December 4, 2022
A 32-year-old man vanishes in Fort Meyers, Fla., and police quickly link an abandoned, blood soaked vehicle to his case, but investigators must determine if this missing man is a victim or killer.
583	22	"Kathryn Sinkevitch"	December 11, 2022
Investigators follow a surveillance trail to uncover the events that led to the death of an Arizona man, who is shot in his garage before he is able to read the results of a paternity test.
584	23	"Donna Arroyo"	December 18, 2022
When a loving father is gunned down in upstate New York, a hunt for the gunman crosses state lines; as several suspects are brought in, investigators must determine who's telling the truth to reveal the mastermind.
585	24	"Barbara Holder"	January 8, 2023
A Texas woman discovers her husband's brutally stabbed body in their ransacked home and police suspect he was the victim of a robbery gone wrong, but the investigation reveals a torrid love affair.
586	25	"Georgina Misener"	January 22, 2023
After what appears to be a fatal road rage incident, authorities in Clifton, Ariz., follow a trail of recovered text messages that suggest this was no random attack, but instead a cold-blooded murder.
587	26	"Kimberly Bailey"	February 5, 2023
A prominent private investigator is reported missing after he fails to return from a business trip; when the case goes cold, a former Russian spy assists the FBI in a sting operation to uncover the truth behind his disappearance.

== Season 32 (2023) ==
Snapped Season 32 episodes
No. overall	No. in season	Title	Original release date
588	1	"Martha Beatty"	February 19, 2023
Police believe that a dependable Florida man left town of his own volition when he fails to show up for work, but as years go by, town rumors lead police to unearth a gruesome crime.
589	2	"Judith Nix"	February 26, 2023
After a loving father is found dead in the bedroom of his Oklahoma home by his ex-wife, Broken Arrow police must unpack a complex family dynamic and a loyalty based on greed in order to get answers.
590	3	"Denice Smith"	March 5, 2023
Crosby, Tenn., is shocked when a beloved father and pastor is found dead outside a ransacked house; police question if this was a robbery gone wrong until an unexpected witness comes forward to reveal the disturbing truth.
591	4	"Colleen Harris"	March 12, 2023
California police receive a bizarre 911 call from an attorney who informs them of a death but won't share more details; an eerie feeling of déjà vu covers the investigation when detectives learn the details of a 30-year-old case in the same home.
592	5	"Connie Brown"	March 19, 2023
After the bloody slaying of two men in rural South Carolina, a witness comes forward with information implicating her own family, leaving police to uncover if blood really is thicker than water.
593	6	"Priscilla Bradford"	March 26, 2023
When a prominent Florida optometrist is bludgeoned to death in his home, Melbourne police must investigate claims of self-defense; the evidence trail leads them to a young witness who reveals a wicked murder plot.
594	7	"Lisa Boldridge"	April 2, 2023
When a father is found shot to death in his country home, the family immediately accuses the victim's on-again/off-again ex-spouse. However, evidence soon suggests there might be more players to blame than simply a woman scorned.
595	8	"Patricia McMillion"	April 9, 2023
After a welfare check is called in on a 53-year-old Texas man, police soon discover him shot to death in a Louisiana swamp that's 450 miles from his home. Detectives devise a sting operation to track down his killer and reveal a vengeful murder plot.
596	9	"Linda Leedom"	April 16, 2023
When a local EMT dies in a suspicious house fire in Mississippi, investigators work for two years to expose the mastermind behind her death and uncover a greedy scheme from an unlikely source.
597	10	"Lynlee Renick"	April 23, 2023
When a renowned Missouri snake breeder is discovered in a pool of blood, investigators believe his death was caused by one of his snakes. However, shocking evidence is found on scene, launching a homicide investigation that unveils a sinister plot.
598	11	"Falicia Blakely"	April 30, 2023
After three Atlanta men are gunned down in the span of three days, detectives connect the murders to two exotic dancers. Knowing only their stage names, investigators race to find the women and uncover the motive behind this devastating crime spree.
599	12	"Candy Jo Webb"	May 7, 2023
After skeletal remains are uncovered at a makeshift dumpsite in Fort Sumner, N.M., investigators are left to untangle a complicated family history that reveals the callous truth behind what happened.
600	13	"Mary Bowles"	May 14, 2023
When human remains are discovered by road workers in West Virginia, a decades-old missing person's case is reopened and investigators are left to unravel an extensive history of scams and violence, leading them to a malicious con-woman.
601	14	"Rosa Medina"	May 21, 2023
A family demands answers when the body of an Arizona woman is discovered in a remote area of Texas. Evidence left behind leads investigators to unravel a web of deceit until a shocking confession reveals the true mastermind.
602	15	"Lulu Sosa"	May 28, 2023
When Texas authorities learn of a murder-for-hire plot against an acclaimed boxer, they must devise an undercover sting operation and race against the clock to save his life and expose the remorseless mastermind.
603	16	"Cheryl Lucero"	June 4, 2023
After a demolition derby driver is found gunned down in his California auto shop, police uncover a dangerous love match that led one woman to commit the ultimate crime.
604	17	"Doris Carlson"	August 20, 2023
After responding to a frantic 911 call from a care-facility nurse who has discovered her patient with severe stab wounds and clinging to life, police receive an unexpected tip that reveals a group of killers inspired by greed.
605	18	"Tikisha Upshaw"	August 27, 2023
When a beloved father and driven entrepreneur is fatally shot at a busy California intersection, authorities discover a recent business venture that led one partnership to turn deadly.
606	19	"Vanessa Cameron"	September 3, 2023
After the body of a young San Antonio man is found dumped in a local cemetery, investigators retrace the victim's steps to untangle a web of deceit that begins with a heartless woman.
607	20	"Cathie Grigsby"	September 10, 2023
The coastal community of Sargent, Texas is thrown into shock when a beloved retiree is found executed in his home. As the investigation unfolds, an unlikely witness comes forward and leads investigators to uncover a malicious murder plot.
608	21	"Sarah Andry"	September 17, 2023
Rumors spread through a small town in Indiana after a well-known resident is found dead in his home after hosting a party; authorities investigate accusations from the partygoers to expose how a toxic love triangle turned deadly.
609	22	"Kimmi Hardy"	September 24, 2023
When an Iowa mother and her newborn son are reported missing, police are in a race against time to rescue the pair and stop a maniacal woman from enacting a dangerous plan.
610	23	"Michael Thomas"	October 1, 2023
When a loving father is shot to death in front of his home by a masked gunman on Halloween night, Los Angeles Police must follow the evidence to determine whether this was a case of holiday hijinks gone awry or something far more sinister.
611	24	"Darryl Williams"	October 8, 2023
Halloween turns into a real-life horror movie when a single mother is gunned down on her way home from trick-or-treating by a costumed killer in Florida. Detectives uncover an unexpected witness that helps reveal the monster behind the mask.
612	25	"Amber Burch"	October 15, 2023
When two men disappear in the quiet community of Clemmons, N.C., rumors started about a devil-worshiping couple and their house of horrors. An investigation leads police to discover there may be more than secrets buried in the backyard.
613	26	"Eric Christensen"	October 22, 2023
When a beloved woman goes missing in Everett, WA, police find that her apartment was the scene of a violent attack. Unable to find her, investigators are led to a coven of modern-day wiccans and one witness who reveals the horrifying truth.

== Season 33 (2023-2024) ==
Snapped Season 33 episodes
No. overall	No. in season	Title	Original release date
614	1	"Bryan Miller"	October 29, 2023
When two young women are brutally murdered in Phoenix, friends and family wait decades for answers. When advancements in DNA reinvigorate the case, police discover their killer has been hiding in plain sight.
615	2	"Betty Wilson"	November 5, 2023
The unaired pilot that analyzes the investigation into the gruesome murder of an esteemed Southern doctor. An anonymous tip leads police to uncover a pattern of lust, greed and a complex dynamic between twin sisters.
616	3	"Susan Polk"	November 12, 2023
Updates to an episode with new details and interviews. The son of a wealthy psychologist finds his father murdered and points the finger at his mother. Investigators delve into the marriage, revealing darkness hidden behind a façade.
617	4	"Lisa Suter"	November 19, 2023
Missouri police are called to the home of a prominent judge's daughter to find her husband dead on the couch. While the crime scene suggests a break-in, investigators uncover evidence of a scandalous murder plot driven by greed.
618	5	"Betty Kirk"	November 26, 2023
When a beloved Florida mother is found brutally shot to death and her newborn missing, investigators race against the clock to track down a mysterious visitor whose motives prove sinister.
619	6	"Joe Campbell"	December 3, 2023
Serenity in the Montana mountains is shattered when a man is shot to death on his neighbor's land. Detectives learn of an escalating dispute over trail access and reenact the shooting to discover if claims of self-defense match the evidence.
620	7	"Neal Zumberge"	December 10, 2023
A feud between neighbors in the quiet suburb of New Brighton, Minn., turns deadly when one man's passion for local wildlife drives his neighbor to snap. Investigators must determine whether the shooter acted out of self-defense or bitter revenge.
621	8	"Lennie Paul Tracey"	December 17, 2023
When an eight-year feud between neighbors in Santa Clarita, Calif., ends in a violent confrontation that leaves one man dead, detectives investigate if the shooting was a tragic case of mistaken identity or a calculated murder plot.
622	9	"Kristie Evans"	December 31, 2023
A beloved pastor is fatally shot in his sleep by a mysterious intruder; investigators uncover a scandalous lifestyle and sordid family secrets that sends shock waves through a small Oklahoma community.
623	10	"Valerie Rider"	January 7, 2024
When a young mother goes missing in rural Ohio, it's a race against time to uncover the truth behind her disappearance; as evidence begins pointing to foul play, investigators fear she may have been the victim of a toxic family dynamic.
624	11	"Angela Wilty"	January 14, 2024
After a hardworking family man is gunned down in his driveway, a domestic dispute leads investigators to an unlikely culprit – and unravels a history of violence, lies and betrayal.
625	12	"Sharon Hurt"	January 21, 2024
A loving father and husband of an aspiring gospel singer is found shot to death in the passenger seat of his car. When investigators discover there was a previous attempt on his life, they expose a group of killers driven by greed.
626	13	"Johnetta Hall"	January 28, 2024
When an Indiana collector of race car memorabilia is found shot in broad daylight with no eyewitnesses, detectives follow the evidence to reveal the true mastermind behind this twisted murder plot.
627	14	"Rita Gluzman"	February 4, 2024
When an officer discovers a man dumping bags of more than 60 body parts in the Passaic River in East Rutherford, N.J., investigators work to identify the victim and corroborate the chilling story of a confessed killer.
628	15	"Kimberly Hancock"	February 18, 2024
A 15-year-old missing persons case is reinstated when an anonymous tipster leads police to unearth a grisly murder. As witnesses come forward, North Carolina investigators must try to piece together the crime and bring the killer to justice.
629	16	"Jennifer Faith"	February 25, 2024
A hardworking family man is shot to death in front of his wife during a morning walk with their dog. As police determine if the attack was random or targeted, they uncover a web of deceit spanning across state lines.
630	17	"20 Year Anniversary Sharee Miller"	May 12, 2024
20 years in the making, this special reexamines the Internet's first murder trial, revealing a twisted seductress with a skill for manipulation; after time in prison, she has a second chance at life and love with a stunning final update in her case.
631	18	"Theresa Cox"	May 19, 2024
When a young Missouri couple are found shot to death on their front porch, the victims' past quickly reveals several suspects close to home. Investigators press for a confession from one of the co-conspirators to expose a master manipulator.
632	19	"Sheila Keen Warren"	May 26, 2024
A beloved mother is fatally shot on her Florida doorstep by someone disguised as a clown. Due to the mysteriously dressed culprit, decades pass before investigators can utilise advancing technology to reveal the killer and salacious motive.
633	20	"Reta Mays"	June 2, 2024
At a VA hospital in West Virginia a string of severe hypoglycemic events results in the deaths of several patients. After an investigation ensues, a deadly pattern reveals the work of a serial killer lurking within the halls of the hospital.
634	21	"Martie Soderberg"	June 9, 2024
A local Washington man's life is at stake when detectives are alerted to a murder-for-hire plot against him. To act quickly, they set up a sting operation to catch the ruthless mastermind before it is too late.
635	22	"Katrina Fouts"	June 16, 2024
After a member of the Indiana cycling community is found mysteriously murdered, medical examiners discover the victim ingested potentially lethal amounts of poisonous mushrooms; Police must work to uncover the culprit behind this bizarre crime.
636	23	"Catherine Pileggi"	June 23, 2024
When Fort Lauderdale, Fla., police respond to reports of a deceased male who fell down the stairs, their investigation turns to a homicide case; with multiple witnesses and an attorney on scene, investigators must dig deep to get to the truth.
637	24	"Lillie Mae Eubank"	June 30, 2024
After returning from several tours of duty abroad, a soldier is found beaten to death on his own army base in Hinesville, Georgia. Investigators soon discover the greatest danger may have been waiting for him closer to home.

== Season 34 (2024) ==
Snapped Season 34 episodes
No. overall	No. in season	Title	Original release date
638	1	"Nicole Thornhill"	July 7, 2024
639	2	"Kelsey Turner"	July 14, 2024
640	3	"Olga Vasquez-Collazos"	July 21, 2024
641	4	"Sydney Powell"	July 28, 2024
642	5	"Barbara Pasa"	August 4, 2024
643	6	"Sasha Skare"	August 11, 2024
644	7	"Viktoriya Nasyrova"	August 18, 2024
645	8	"Debra Taylor"	August 25, 2024
646	9	"Tonica Jenkins"	September 1, 2024
647	10	"Felicia Barden"	September 8, 2024
648	11	"Carole Gold"	September 15, 2024
649	12	"Mary Orsimi"	September 22, 2024
650	13	"Cathleen Roth"	October 6, 2024
651	14	"Roberta Samard"	October 13, 2024
652	15	"Joyce Pelzer"	October 20, 2024
653	16	"Kimberly Williams"	October 27, 2024
654	17	"Danelle Geier"	November 3, 2024
655	18	"Ezra McCandless"	November 10, 2024
656	19	"Tiesh Rhue"	November 17, 2024
657	20	"Camilla Frazier"	November 24, 2024
658	21	"Jill Blackstone"	December 1, 2024
659	22	"Margaret "Frankie" Kellis"	December 15, 2024
660	23	"Kimberly Fletcher Groh"	December 22, 2024
661	24	"Jennifer Blake"	December 29, 2024

== Season 35 (2025) ==
Snapped Season 35 episodes
No. overall	No. in season	Title	Original release date
662	1	"Brenda Watson"	January 5, 2025
663	2	"Taylor Wardlaw"	January 12, 2025
664	3	"Kimberly Saenz"	January 19, 2025
665	4	"Donna Horwitz"	January 26, 2025
666	5	"Angela Sanford"	February 2, 2025
667	6	"Tashia Stuart"	February 16, 2025
668	7	"Denise Gray"	February 23, 2025
669	8	"Amy Reese"	May 25, 2025
670	9	"Sierra Jane Inscoe"	June 1, 2025
671	10	"Kathleen Witte"	June 8, 2025
672	11	"Shawnie Vel Young"	June 15, 2025
673	12	"Connie Pfieffer"	June 29, 2025
674	13	"Angelita Wright"	July 6, 2025
675	14	"Ina Kenoyer"	July 13, 2025
676	15	"Ulisa Chavers"	July 20, 2025
677	16	"Deborah Mosby"	August 3, 2025
678	17	"Ashley Nicole Haydt"	August 10, 2025
679	18	"Ashley Benefield"	August 17, 2025
680	19	"Kimberly Reps"	August 24, 2025
681	20	"Leah Cuevas"	September 7, 2025
682	21	"Nistasha Tate"	September 14, 2025
683	22	"Sherry Heffernan"	September 21, 2025
684	23	"Marique Ruth"	September 28, 2025
685	24	"Gina Spann"	October 12, 2025
686	25	"Jessica Quintanilla"	October 19, 2025

== Season 36 (2026) ==
Snapped Season 36 episodes
No. overall	No. in season	Title	Original release date
687	1	"Heather Hoffman"	January 4, 2026
688	2	"Elizabeth Carserino"	January 11, 2026
689	3	"Deborah Frazier"	January 18, 2026
690	4	"Brookey Lee West"	January 25, 2026
691	5	"Samantha Rabon"	February 1, 2026
692	6	"Kimethia Coleman"	March 8, 2026
693	7	"Evelyn Zigerelli-Henderson"	March 15, 2026
694	8	"Stella Lacy"	March 22, 2026
695	9	"Julie Harper"	March 29, 2026
696	10	"Trista Hrabak"	April 5, 2026
697	11	"Olivia Moody"	April 12, 2026
698	12	"Jennifer Sweeney"	April 19, 2026
699	13	"Natalie Cochran"	July 19, 2026
700	14	"Jacqueline Johnson-Cabrera"	July 26, 2026
701	15	"Antonetta Stevens"	August 2, 2026
702	16	"Nicole Nachtman"	August 9, 2026
703	17	"Tammy Moorer"	August 16, 2026
704	18	"LaFredia Todd"	August 23, 2026
705	19	"Nikki Hillrich"	August 30, 2026
706	20	"Yessenia Sanchez"	September 13, 2026
707	21	"Lara Paige Conley"	September 20, 2026
708	22	"Jennifer Reali"	September 27, 2026
709	23	"Jasmine Femia"	October 4, 2026
710	24	"Sarah Ramey"	October 11, 2026
