= Florence McClure Women's Correctional Center =

State prison in Nevada, United States

- Interactive map of Florence McClure Women's Correctional Center
- Location: 4370 Smiley Road NOT North Las Vegas, Nevada 89115; 36°15′27″N 115°04′37″W
- Status: Operational
- Security class: Minimum to Maximum
- Capacity: 950 (171 staff)
- Population: 950 Female inmates (May 10, 2021)
- Opened: September 1, 1997
- Former name: Southern Nevada Women's Correctional Facility
- Managed by: Nevada Department of Corrections
- Warden: William Reubart

The Florence McClure Women's Correctional Center (FMWCC, originally the Southern Nevada Women's Correctional Facility) is a state prison for women in North Las Vegas, Nevada, United States. All custody levels (minimum, medium and maximum) are housed there. It is operated by the Nevada Department of Corrections (NDOC). It houses Nevada's female death row.

== History ==
The Southern Nevada Women's Correctional Facility opened September 1, 1997. It was built and operated by Corrections Corporation of America. Built for $28 million, it was the first and only privately run prison in Nevada. It relieved prisons at Carson City and Indian Springs. A women's facility at Carson City, Warm Springs Correctional Center, was converted to house male inmates. The 145,000-square-foot (13,500 m^{2}) Southern Nevada Women's Correctional Center was built to house around 500 inmates. The dedication was held on Saturday, September 13, 1997, with inmates being moved in the following week.

In 2003, Correctional Officer Randy Easter raped inmate Korinda Martin. A judge sentenced the two to probation. On February 23, 2004, the Corrections Corporation of America said that they would not renew their contract to operate the facility, which expired on October 1, 2004. Officials stated that the company lost over $1 million per year while operating the facility. The Nevada Department of Corrections (NDOC) solicited bids for another private company to operate the prison. Bids were due on May 4, 2004. State Senator Bob Coffin objected to the idea of another private company operating the prison. NDOC assumed direct control on October 1, 2004. Nevada State Senate Bill 330, which renamed the prison after prisoner advocate Florence McClure, passed unanimously in the Nevada Senate on Thursday April 5, 2007. Florence McClure spoke at the dedication ceremony in November 2007, at which the name was officially changed. Florence McClure died in November 2009.

== The facility ==
The current capacity of FMWCC is 888. This number does not include three housing units and new infirmary that were completed in July 2009. This facility now housed Maximum Security also.

The Warden of FMWCC also oversees operations at the Jean Conservation Camp at Jean, Nevada, and Casa Grande Transitional Housing in Las Vegas.

== Notable inmates ==
- Margaret Rudin
- Kelly Ryan
- Kelsey Turner
- Brookey Lee West

== Death Row ==
- Priscilla Joyce Ford
