= Florence McClure =

American activist

Florence Alberta Shilling McClure (September 26, 1921 – November 5, 2009) was an American activist.

== Early life ==
McClure was born Florence Alberta Schilling on September 26, 1921, in Centralia, Illinois. She attended MacMurray College for Women and then transferred to Hardin Business College. After graduating in October 1941, she worked for the government during World War II where she met her husband, James McClure, an officer in the United States Air Force, while she was working at the Security and Intelligence Division in Miami, Florida. The couple had two children, James and Carolyn, and after her husband retired from the military during the 1950s, the family moved to California.

== Career and activism ==
In 1966, they moved to Las Vegas, Nevada. McClure was hired by Burton Cohen, who she assisted in opening the New Frontier Hotel and Casino. She helped develop it into a popular resort and became one of the first female executives in the resort industry. She then worked as office manager to Howard Hughes at the Desert Inn. She was one of the founders of the Las Vegas chapter of Soroptimist International. She joined the Las Vegas chapter of the League of Women Voters in 1966 and later became the state president. She was inspired by fellow activist Jean Ford who she met through the organization. McClure also joined the Nevada Women's Lobby.

McClure began studying for her bachelor's degree in 1969 when she was 48, graduating from the University of Nevada, Las Vegas with a degree in sociology in 1971. She worked with Sandi Petta to found Community Action Against Rape (CAAR), a crisis rape center that originally operated out of her family's living room. She petitioned state senator Richard Bryan in 1975 to change the law allowing rape victims to be questioned about their sexual history. She also successfully challenged state laws on marital rape, child pornography and victim compensation.

When a new women's prison was proposed to be built in Pioche, McClure successfully blocked the project, forcing it to be opened instead in North Las Vegas where it would be more easily accessible to families. The prison was renamed in her honor, the Florence McClure Women's Correctional Center, in 2007.

== Death and legacy ==
McClure died on November 5, 2009, at the age of 88. A documentary was made about her life titled "Hurricane Flo", produced by Marlene Adrian.
