= Priscilla Ford =

American mass murderer

Priscilla Joyce Ford
- Born: Priscilla Joyce Ford; February 10, 1929; Berrien Springs, Michigan, U.S.
- Died: January 29, 2005 (aged 75); Southern Nevada Women's Correctional Center, North Las Vegas, Nevada, U.S.
- Occupation: Teacher
- Children: 3
- Status: Deceased
- Convictions: First degree murder (6 counts); Attempted murder (23 counts)
- Penalty: Death

Details
- Date: November 27, 1980; 3:00 pm
- Country: United States
- Location: Reno, Nevada
- Killed: 6
- Injured: 23
- Weapon: 1974 Lincoln Continental

Priscilla Joyce Ford (February 10, 1929 – January 29, 2005) was an American convicted mass murderer, who was sentenced to death for killing six people on Thanksgiving Day 1980 in Reno, Nevada by driving her car on the sidewalk into a crowd of people. She injured 23 more.

A former teacher in New York, Ford had struggled for years with mental illness: she had been diagnosed as having paranoid schizophrenia with religious and violent tendencies. She had been treated and released by seven different hospitals before moving to Reno in 1980.

Ford filed numerous appeals of her death sentence. She was still being held on death row when she died of emphysema in prison, at the age of 75. She had long been a heavy smoker.

== Biography ==
Ford was born in 1929 in Berrien Springs, Michigan and grew up there. She attended public schools and was trained as a teacher. Ford taught school in New York for some years before her life began to deteriorate.

She married twice and had a total of three children, two sons and a daughter. In 1957, Ford shot her second husband in self-defense; she said he had abused her. She shot herself afterward, but survived.

Her daughter, Wynter Scott, was born in 1962. When Wynter was eleven, Ford was arrested for trespassing and assault. The state's child welfare office removed the girl and ultimately placed her with Ford's relatives in Los Angeles.

Through the years, Ford became a heavy smoker, a habit often associated with mental illness. She developed emphysema. She died of that progressive disease in prison at the age of 75, on January 29, 2005.

Because of her death sentence and several appeals, she was held on death row for 20 years at Southern Nevada Women's Correctional Center in North Las Vegas, Nevada. Such prisoners are highly isolated, which may cause or aggravate mental illness.

== Thanksgiving Day events ==
In Reno, Nevada, a crowd gathered to see the annual Thanksgiving Day parade. Suddenly, someone drove a Lincoln Continental car onto the sidewalk next to Virginia Street and through the crowd for an estimated 100 feet. A total of six people were killed by this attack, and 23 more were injured. Five of the victims died at the scene, they were Paul Nitzel of Sunnyvale, California, 53-year-old Josephine Starkey of Sparks, Nevada, 20-year-old Jolene Cranmer of New York City, 80-year-old Iva Britain and 60-year-old John Koschella, both of Reno, Nevada.

Police at the scene ordered the driver out of the car. The woman did not resist and was identified as Priscilla Joyce Ford, who said she had moved to Reno that year. Ford's blood-alcohol ratio was later found to be .162, above the legal limit for driving.

As the Deputy District Attorney on call, John Oakes went to the crime scene. He said that Ford was remarkably calm when he talked with her. When she asked Oakes how many people she killed, he said, "five or six," and she said, "good". Another officer reported that Ford said, "The more dead, the better," while she was in custody.

=== Arrest and trial ===
After being arrested, Ford was found to have had a history of mental illness and had been diagnosed with paranoid schizophrenia, resulting in violent tendencies. She had been hospitalized and treated over the years at seven different facilities before moving to Reno.

She was assigned a Public Defender, who asked for a mental evaluation. On January 29, 1981, Ford was found incompetent to stand trial. She was held in custody and sent to Lake's Crossing for mental treatment. During this period and later, she reported hearing the voices of such figures as Joan Bennett Kennedy (wife of US Senator Edward Kennedy) and journalist Barbara Walters. On April 29, 1981, Ford was ordered to submit to treatment, including drug therapy." On August 4, 1981, Ford was found competent to stand trial.

She pleaded not guilty by reason of insanity. The trial lasted almost five months, the longest in northern Nevada history. The jury consisted of seven women and five men.

Ford insisted on testifying in her defense. She stated that she was the reincarnation of Jesus Christ and therefore incapable of sin.

In his summary, her public defender, Lew Carnahan, noted her history of severe mental illness and said that the death penalty would be an injustice. He pleaded for her to be sentenced to life in a criminal mental institution where she could be treated. The District Attorney Cal Dunlap described her as "evil personified" and fought for Ford to be found legally sane at the time of her driving into the crowd.

After 13 hours of deliberation, the jury found Ford guilty on six counts of murder and 23 counts of attempted murder on March 19, 1982. On March 28, 1982, the jury voted separately on the death penalty and decided in favor of capital punishment. (Note: Even though seven people died as a result of Ford's attack, issues in the indictment caused Ford to only be charged with six.)

== See also ==
- Darrell Brooks
- Olga Hepnarová
- List of people claimed to be Jesus
