= Kelsey Turner =

American adult star and murderer (born 1993)

Kelsey Nichole Turner
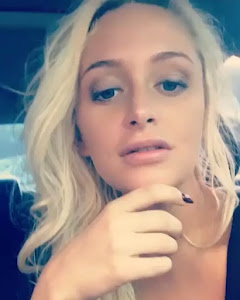
- Born: Kelsey Nichole Ingram; May 5, 1993 (age 33); Norfolk, Virginia, U.S.
- Education: Arkansas State University
- Parent(s): Samantha Ingram (mother), Christopher Ingram (father)
- Status: Incarcerated
- Conviction: Second degree murder
- Penalty: 10 to 25 years imprisonment

Details
- Imprisoned at: Florence McClure Women's Correctional Center

Kelsey Nichole Turner (born May 5, 1993) is an American murderer and former adult model. She has appeared in magazines such as Playboy, Maxim, and OneTen.

In 2019, Turner and her ex-boyfriend were accused of killing a Salinas psychiatrist, Dr. Thomas Burchard. She was arrested by FBI agents and Las Vegas police in Stockton, California, on March 21, 2019, and underwent a criminal trial for three years. She eventually pleaded guilty and was sentenced to 10 to 25 years in prison in January 2023.

== Early life ==
Turner was born on May 5, 1993, in Norfolk, Virginia, and grew up in Jonesboro, Arkansas. Later, she started modeling for adult magazines. During her modeling days, she lived in Salinas, California and Las Vegas, Nevada.

== Murder of Dr. Thomas Burchard ==
Turner and her ex-boyfriend Jon "Logan" Kennison have been in custody since 2019 for the murder of Dr. Thomas Burchard, a child psychiatrist. They are accused of beating the 71 year old psychiatrist to death with a baseball bat and a gun, then stuffing his body into the trunk of Turner's Mercedes.

Judy Earp, the victim's fiancé, claims that Burchard had given Turner around $750,000 to be his "sugar baby" over a period of several years. Earp claims Burchard's last words to her were: "She's such a pervasive liar that I have to see for myself."

Burchard's body was discovered in the trunk of Turner's vehicle, which had been abandoned on a desert road outside Las Vegas.

Turner was arrested by FBI agents and Las Vegas police in Stockton, California, on March 21, 2019. Her trial lasted three years. In July 2022, in the wake of Kennison pleading guilty, she agreed to accept an Alford guilty plea. On November 9, 2022, she signed the plea deal, despite maintaining her innocence. On January 10, 2023, she was sentenced to 10 to 25 years in prison.

Kennison pleaded guilty in June 2022 to second-degree murder with a deadly weapon and conspiracy to commit murder. He was sentenced to 18 to 45 years for his role in the murder. A roommate of the couple, Diana Nicole Pena, pleaded guilty to being an accessory to murder and provided prosecutors with critical evidence.

Turner is currently incarcerated at the Florence McClure Women's Correctional Center in Nevada.
