= Margaret Rudin =

American with a vacated murder conviction (born 1943)

Margaret Rudin (née Margaret Lee Frost; born May 31, 1943) is an American woman convicted in May 2001 of the December 1994 murder of her fifth husband, Las Vegas real estate magnate Ronald Rudin. She was incarcerated at Florence McClure Women's Correctional Center in North Las Vegas, Nevada.

Rudin, then 76 years old, was released on parole in January 2020. She continued her decades-long appeal of her conviction, and her conviction was vacated in May 2022, on the grounds of ineffective legal representation by her defense attorney in 2001. The district attorney chose not to retry Rudin, so a judge dismissed the charges on December 9, 2024.

== Early life ==
Rudin was born in Memphis, Tennessee, one of three siblings. The family moved frequently, and before graduating from high school, Rudin had lived in 15 states. Rudin had been four times before meeting Ronald Rudin, who also had four previous marriages, at the First Church of Religious Science in Las Vegas; the couple wed on September 11, 1987.

== Murder and investigation ==
Ronald Rudin (born November 13, 1930, Chicago) disappeared on December 18, 1994, aged 64, after walking to Margaret's antique shop, which was in the same strip mall as his real estate office.

On January 21, 1995, his charred dismembered remains were discovered near Lake Mojave, along with the burnt remains of an antique steamer trunk. He had been shot in the head, at least four times, with a .22 caliber gun. Police later searched the Rudin residence, and found blood spatter in the bedroom, as well as semen on the floor.

On July 21, 1996, a .22 caliber Ruger handgun was found in Lake Mead, and was traced back to Ron Rudin. The handgun was later confirmed to be the murder weapon. Ron Rudin had reported the gun missing in 1988, shortly after he married Margaret.

== Flight, arrest, and trial ==
On April 18, 1997, the grand jury handed down a murder indictment against Margaret Rudin, but by then she had left the state. She spent the next 31 months in hiding. She was arrested in Massachusetts in November 1999, and was extradited to Nevada to face murder charges in the death of her husband.

Margaret Rudin went on trial on March 2, 2001. Her defense claimed that her husband was killed due to illegal activities he was involved in. The prosecutor argued she had killed her husband to prevent him from divorcing her and losing what she would inherit from his estate. She was found guilty on May 2, 2001, and later sentenced to life in prison, with the possibility of parole after 20 years.

== Appeal ==
Rudin filed an appeal, claiming that, despite having three defence attorneys at trial, she had received ineffective assistance of counsel. In 2002, the Nevada Supreme Court denied Margaret Rudin's appeal, finding she was not denied effective assistance of counsel. As of 2008, no record of federal collateral review could be found.

In 2008, Rudin was given a new trial. Clark County District Judge Sally Loehrer ruled that lawyers for Margaret Rudin were not prepared to defend her at her 2001 trial, according to lawyers on both sides of the case. She also ruled that Michael Amador, Rudin's lead attorney at the time, was not effective, according to Christopher Oram, Rudin's new attorney. In fact, Amador's co-counsel on the case, Tom Pitaro, wrote in an affidavit that Amador had been shockingly unprepared, with experts not hired and witnesses left unprepared. Amador was also accused of conflict of interest, having allegedly sold information to the National Enquirer while also working on a book about the case during the trial.

On May 10, 2010, the Nevada Supreme Court overturned the lower court's ruling, and Rudin's original conviction stood.

The Las Vegas Sun reported on April 26, 2011 that Margaret Rudin had filed a habeas corpus petition in federal court seeking a new trial and reversal of her conviction, based upon ineffective assistance of trial counsel, impermissible hearsay testimony, faulty jury instructions and other points.

On January 25, 2012, U.S. District Court Judge Roger L. Hunt dismissed Margaret Rudin's federal habeas corpus case with prejudice. In a nine-page decision, Judge Hunt found that Rudin's federal petition was not filed in a timely manner. The ruling paved way for an appeal to the Ninth Circuit Court in San Francisco.

On September 10, 2014, in a split decision by a three-judge panel, the United States Court of Appeals for the Ninth Circuit affirmed the district court's order dismissing Rudin's federal habeas corpus case, despite what it acknowledged to be serious issues with her representation and prosecution, both pre- and post-conviction. The court deemed that it was compelled to deny her petition, although it acknowledged that it was "troubled" by the case.

Excerpts from the Opinion's Conclusion:

We are troubled by the outcome of this case for many reasons. Margaret Rudin's direct appeal and collateral review proceedings have been pending in either state or federal court for a combined total of 13 years. She has potentially meritorious claims that she has suffered prejudice at the hands of her own attorneys' egregious misconduct. Yet she has never had an opportunity to present those claims in court.

Rudin's defense counsel, Amador, indisputably engaged in egregious professional misconduct during the course of her underlying criminal trial. On direct appeal of her judgment of conviction, the Nevada Supreme Court acknowledged that Rudin's trial was plagued not only with inadequacies on the part of defense counsel, but also with prosecutorial misconduct and legal error on the part of the State and the court. Although two members of the Nevada Supreme Court found the record sufficiently clear as to the "inherent prejudice created by [trial counsel]" to require immediate reversal of Rudin's judgment of conviction, a majority of the court declined to address the effect of those errors, finding them more appropriate for resolution on collateral review.

[A]t this point, Rudin is still in prison, having served 13 years of her life sentence for murder. We know from the state post-conviction court that the State's "proof of guilt [at that trial] was not a slam dunk by any stretch of the imagination." We also know from the post-conviction court that, had Rudin been represented by competent counsel, the jury's verdict may have been different. Thus, what we do not know is whether Rudin is lawfully imprisoned. And, regrettably, that is something we may never know.

On March 10, 2015, the Ninth Circuit Court of Appeals withdrew its opinion of September 10, 2014. In its revised opinion, they affirmed the trial court's decision that Rudin was entitled to a new trial as a direct result of the professional misconduct and prejudicial conflict of interest by Michael Amador, her original trial lawyer.

On February 29, 2016, the United States Supreme Court denied a petition by the attorney general of Nevada challenging the Ninth Circuit's ruling.

In October, 2019, Rudin was granted parole. She walked out of prison on January 10, 2020. Nonetheless, she made clear that she would pursue every available avenue to have her conviction overturned.

In May 2022, United States District Judge Richard F. Boulware vacated the murder conviction of the 78-year-old Rudin after she had spent 20 years in prison. Boulware ruled that Rudin received ineffective legal representation from her late defense attorney. The state announced that they would no longer pursue the case, although they never said that they knew her to be innocent, either. Charges were dismissed on December 9, 2024; this enabled her to sue the state for wrongful conviction.

== Release ==
Margaret Rudin was released on parole from the Florence McClure Women's Correctional Center on January 10, 2020. She told the Las Vegas Review-Journal that she intended to relocate to Chicago to be closer to her son, daughter, grandson and great-grandchildren, and that she was "optimistic her murder conviction will one day be tossed." She was 76 years old at release.

After her conviction was vacated in 2022, the possibility was left open that she could still be re-tried for her husband's murder. Charges were dismissed on December 9, 2024.

== Media ==
=== Books ===
"If I Die...: A True Story of Obsessive Love, Uncontrollable Greed, and Murder" by Michael Fleeman, while detailing the case against Rudin, the hunt authorities endeavored in her capture is also detailed; ISBN 9781429904292, published: 2007, 324 pages.

"Black Widow: The True Story of Margaret Rudin" by Brianna Valdes, Rudin's attorneys claimed that involvement in illegal activities led to Ron's death; ISBN 9781539041528, published: September 2016, 84 pages.

"Evil Women" by John Marlowe, one of the thirty-four cases covered in this writing is about Margaret Rudin's alleged killing of her husband; ISBN 9781788284660, published: November 2017, 303 pages.

=== Television ===
Court TV's (now TruTV) crime documentary series Mugshots interviewed Rudin inside a Las Vegas, Nevada prison. In the episode, Rudin said she was innocent and that the district attorney had unjustly charged her. The A&E Network series American Justice also released an episode (season 6; episode 11) about her case, titled "The Black Widow of Vegas".

Additional television shows reported on Margaret Rudin, Snapped: Margaret Rudin (2007)" season 5; episode 5, on the Oxygen channel; an entire CBS 48 Hours episode, "Murder in Las Vegas: Did She Do it?" in November 2001 and "Forensic Files" – Season 9; Episode 27 "For Love or Money".

The HLN (Headline News) series Beyond Reasonable Doubt episode "Murder in Vegas" docudrama covers Rudin's crimes; Season 1 Episode 6, originally aired: July 7, 2017.

The Investigation Discovery channel's series The Perfect Murder, episode "Vanished in Vegas" covers Ron Rudin's murder; Season: 5, Episode: 8, originally aired: September 13, 2018.

20/20 aired an episode from season 43 titled "Five Weddings and a Murder" on February 19, 2021.
