= Brookey Lee West =

American murderer

- Born: June 28, 1953 (age 73); United States
- Spouse: Howard Simon St. John (m. 1994; body discovered 1994)
- Status: Incarcerated
- Conviction: First degree murder
- Penalty: Life imprisonment without parole

Details
- Victims: 1–3
- Country: United States
- State: Nevada
- Date apprehended: September 8, 2001
- Imprisoned at: Florence McClure Women's Correctional Center, North Las Vegas, Nevada

Brookey Lee West (born June 28, 1953) is a convicted American murderer who is currently sentenced to life imprisonment at the Florence McClure Women's Correctional Center for the murder of her mother, Christine Smith in February 1998. Though officially convicted of one murder she is suspected to have killed 3 people including her brother and husband. She was also suspected in the attempted murder of Diane Smith.

== Early life ==
West grew up with her father, Leroy Smith, who taught her witchcraft, Satanism and violence from a young age. Her mother, Christine Smith, had numerous affairs and often neglected West and her brother, Travis Smith.

== Criminal career ==
In 1993, Travis Smith disappeared. Though a body was never found, West was accused of having connections to Travis's disappearance after it was discovered that a man had checked into Santa Clara Valley Medical Center using Travis's social security number and the bill was sent to an address where West was residing.

In 1994, West married Howard Simon St. John. In May of that year, Simon St. John filed a spousal abuse claim after West allegedly assaulted Simon with a .32 handgun. The charges were dropped later that month. Two weeks later his body was found near Lower Coffee Camp in Springville, California. The cause of death was determined to be gunshot wounds.

While Brookey's father, Leroy Smith, was dying of cancer in 1996, West was suspected of assaulting Diane Smith with a stun gun.

In 1998, Christine Smith, West's elderly mother had been suffering from alcoholism and disappeared in February of that year. West claimed she sent her mother to live with her brother in California. Police had initially believed the story until February 5, 2001, when Christine's body was discovered in a garbage can by a Las Vegas storage unit. West explained that her mother had died of natural causes and in a panic West stuffed her mother's body in a garbage can.

West was arrested on September 5, 2001. Neal Haskell, a forensic entomologist at Saint Joseph's College suspected foul play due to the lack of blow flies on the corpse. Instead coffin flies were found on the corpse which meant the body was either put into the garbage can immediately after death or while the person was still alive. The prosecution determined that West killed her mother in order to benefit from Christine's monthly $1,000 Social Security checks. West was found guilty of first degree murder and sentenced to life imprisonment at Florence McClure Women's Correctional Center.

In 2004, West requested a retrial, maintaining her claim that her mother had died of natural causes. The prosecution argued that "there was ample evidence to convict West of first-degree murder". In 2012, West attempted to escape from Florence McClure Women's Correctional Center by walking out the front entrance. She was caught and reprimanded.

West was covered in the 6th season of American true-life crime television series, Deadly Women. She was also featured in the 5th season of Snapped.

== See also ==
- List of homicides in Nevada
