= Snapped: Killer Couples =

American true crime television series on the Oxygen network

- Genre: True crime Docudrama
- Written by: Matt Edens; Eric Wetherington; Brian O'Connor; Geoffrey Proud; Todd Moss
- Narrated by: Laura San Giacomo; Sharon Martin; Anna Vocino
- Composers: Brian Langsbard; Justin Melland
- Country of origin: United States
- Original language: English
- No. of seasons: 18
- No. of episodes: 200

Production
- Executive producers: Erica Diaz-Gant; Kimberly Chessler; Amy Introcaso-Davis; Stephen Land; Deborah Allen; Zak Weisfeld; Geoffrey Proud
- Producers: Michael Rogers; Donna Dudek; Elizabeth Gibson; Katie Harrington; Cecile Bouchardeau; David Lane; Melissa May; Todd Moss; Jane Nowiski; Brian O'Connor; Valerie Shepherd; Mariel Sykes; Eric Wetherington
- Cinematography: Paul Foster; Eric Futrell; Erin Althaus; Jeffrey Woods
- Running time: 30 minutes/60 minutes
- Production company: Jupiter Entertainment

Original release
- Network: Oxygen
- Release: March 10, 2013 – present

Related
- Snapped Snapped: She Made Me Do It

Snapped: Killer Couples (known as Killer Couples from seasons 7 to 15) is an American true crime television series currently airing on the Oxygen Network. The program details couples who commit crimes together. The program is a spin-off of the Oxygen series Snapped and has a similar format to the Investigation Discovery program Wicked Attraction. As of July 2026, the show has aired 200 episodes across eighteen seasons. The current narrator is Anna Vocino.

== Synopsis ==
The series is similar to parent show Snapped, except that each episode features a couple who have committed murder or attempted murder or have been accused of committing or attempting to commit murder. Like the original series, the program is presented in a documentary style, using a central voice-over narration by actress Anna Vocino, as well as interviews with people who have first-hand knowledge of the case.

== Production ==
Snapped: Killer Couples first aired on March 10, 2013, with the episode, "Amanda Logue & Jason Andrews". The series is currently in its seventeenth season of production at Jupiter Entertainment. A successful spinoff of the original Snapped series, the show played an important part in Oxygen's transition to a completely crime-focused network in mid-2017. From 2016 to 2021, Oxygen simply referred to the program as Killer Couples, with no mention of the original Snapped series in the title. In the show's sixteenth season in 2022, Oxygen reverted to using the series' original title Snapped: Killer Couples.

== Episodes ==
Season	Episodes	Originally released	
Season	Episodes	First released	Last released
1	10	March 10, 2013	August 4, 2013
2	10	November 3, 2013	March 2, 2014
3	10	June 8, 2014	August 10, 2014
4	10	October 5, 2014	January 25, 2015
5	10	April 26, 2015	June 28, 2015
6	10	October 11, 2015	December 13, 2015
7	10	April 3, 2016	June 5, 2016
8	10	August 6, 2016	October 8, 2016
9	10	January 13, 2018	March 24, 2018
10	10	October 7, 2018	January 13, 2019
11	10	January 21, 2019	March 25, 2019
12	10	July 13, 2019	November 14, 2019
13	10	February 13, 2020	April 16, 2020
14	10	June 18, 2020	August 20, 2020
15	10	May 23, 2021	June 25, 2021
16	10	April 17, 2022	June 19, 2022
17	20	June 11, 2023	May 5, 2024
18	20	March 2, 2025	July 12, 2026

=== Season 1 (2013) ===
No. overall	No. in season	Title	Original release date
1	1	"Amanda Logue and Jason Andrews"	March 10, 2013
A housewife turned porn star teams up with her co-star to commit murder after a wild sex party.
2	2	"Jennifer Henderson and Skylar Deleon"	March 17, 2013
A seemingly devout evangelical housewife and a former child star devise a scandalous murder plot that ends with a bizarre attempt at a sex change operation.
3	3	"Sarah Edmondson and Ben Darras"	March 24, 2013
A teenaged girl from a prominent political family falls for a boy with a sordid past, and the young lovers embark on a psychedelic road trip inspired by their favorite movie: Natural Born Killers.
4	4	"Tina Leja and Darnell Smith"	March 31, 2013
A homecoming queen turned prison guard falls in love with an inmate and finds herself willing to do anything to make him happy.
5	5	"Tylar Witt and Steven Colver"	April 7, 2013
This couple was the Romeo and Juliet of their time, but in order to spend eternity together they had to eliminate the person that stood in their way.
6	6	"Laura Hall and Colton Pitonyak"	April 28, 2013
The dismembered body of a young woman exposes the dark side of two former honor students.
7	7	"Elizabeth Turpin and Karen Brown"	July 7, 2013
A blood soaked scene leaves police to wonder if there's more than meets the eye between a young newlywed and her openly gay co-worker.
8	8	"Donna Moonda and Damian Bradford"	July 21, 2013
A shocking affair between a wealthy doctor's wife and a much younger bad boy ends in violence.
9	9	"Nicole Kasinskas and Billy Sullivan"	July 28, 2013
Teenage lovers become so obsessed with one another, they go to deadly ends to make sure they can stay together forever.
10	10	"Tabitha Messina and Carlos Christopher"	August 4, 2013
An argument over a borrowed cell phone links teenage lovers to a double homicide.

=== Season 2 (2013–14) ===
No. overall	No. in season	Title	Original release date
11	1	"Tina Loesch and Skye Hanson"	November 3, 2013
A jailhouse romance between a woman and her cellmate leads to deadly results on the outside.
12	2	"Coty Martinez and Jeremy Brooks"	November 10, 2013
A modern-day Bonnie and Clyde embark on a two-month, multi-state crime wave that sends shockwaves across the country.
13	3	"Emilia Carr and Joshua Fulgham"	November 17, 2013
A bitter love triangle turns deadly after a jealous lover refuses to let go.
14	4	"Rachel Cumberland and John Williams"	November 24, 2013
A trucker couple traveling the highways of the United States are hiding a dark secret: they're road-bound maniacs with unquenchable appetites for wild sex, hard drugs, and cold-blooded murder.
15	5	"Elizabeth Haysom and Jens Soering"	December 1, 2013
A young socialite and the privileged son of a German diplomat contrive a deadly scheme to stay together.
16	6	"Tiffany Cole and Michael Jackson"	December 8, 2013
When two hard-partying lovers fall on hard times they turn to an elderly couple for help, but the older couple's generosity is soon repaid with cold-blooded betrayal.
17	7	"Cindy Hendy and David Parker Ray"	February 9, 2014
An escaped victim of the famous Toy Box Killings exposes a couple whose extreme tastes for sadism and death would shock the nation.
18	8	"Alicia Woodward and John Esposito"	February 16, 2014
A summer romance takes a dark turn when two outcast teens turn a cross-country joy ride into a full on killing spree.
19	9	"Cynthia Coffman and James Marlow"	February 23, 2014
A pair of psychopathic lovers fall in love after being locked up in the same jail - and their obsession for one another is only matched by their dual addiction for rampant crime and unbridled mayhem.
20	10	"Suzan Carson and Michael Carson"	March 2, 2014
Two lost and lonely hippies fall in love, deciding to turn their backs on the modern world for a life of hallucinogenic drugs, new-age religion, and a multi-state murder spree.

=== Season 3 (2014) ===
No. overall	No. in season	Title	Original release date
21	1	"Christa Pike and Tadaryl Shipp"	June 8, 2014
A pair of troubled teens take their dark obsessions to the extreme when their romance is threatened by a classmate.
22	2	"Brenda Andrew and James Pavatt"	June 15, 2014
Two Sunday school teachers become cold-blooded killers when they conspire to murder one of their spouses for insurance money.
23	3	"Tracey Poirier and Tamara Upton"	June 22, 2014
Two lesbians seduce a pool shark, Donald Fish, and take him to a park, and end up stoning him to his death.
24	4	"Raelynne Simonin and David Danylchuk"	June 29, 2014
Two lovers conspire to commit murder - and get their hands on a million dollar insurance payout.
25	5	"Darlene George and Rennie Cassimy"	July 6, 2014
An extramarital affair heats up when two lovers conspire to kill one of their spouses in order to avoid losing everything in a divorce.
26	6	"Jennifer Walter and Christopher Gregory"	July 13, 2014
Two sex-obsessed strip club employees start a passionate relationship that quickly turns into a dance with death.
27	7	"Jennifer Mee and Lamont Newton"	July 20, 2014
A bizarre hiccupping affliction gives a teen her 15 minutes of fame. But when the limelight fades she finds her adrenaline rush in a relationship with a bad boy, and uses social networking to lure a man to his death.
28	8	"Deidre Hunt and Kosta Fotopolous"	July 27, 2014
After a murder-for-hire goes dreadfully awry, surprise video evidence may help police prove just how far this couple is willing to go to rule the Daytona empire.
29	9	"Karla Homolka and Paul Bernardo"	August 3, 2014
A couple's mutual passion for sex and torture destroys the lives of everyone they encounter.
30	10	"Gwendolyn Graham and Cathy Wood"	August 10, 2014
A pair of female serial killers turn a nursing home into a hotbed of sex, scandal, and murder.

=== Season 4 (2014–15) ===
No. overall	No. in season	Title	Original release date
31	1	"Amanda Hayes and Grant Hayes"	October 5, 2014
A turbulent love triangle takes a deadly turn - leaving behind a dismembered body, and a killer couple pointing the finger at each other in the aftermath.
32	2	"Brittany Smith and Jabrai Copney"	October 12, 2014
An Ivy League student and a music producer's criminal activities are discovered when a failed drug deal leads to murder.
33	3	"Michelle Michaud and James Daveggio"	October 19, 2014
A couple's dark sexual cravings lead to a series of assaults that only become more gruesome as things heat up.
34	4	"Sara Aldrete and Adolfo Constanzo"	October 26, 2014
In the Mexican desert, two cult leaders' passion for torture and human sacrifice is exposed when they pick the wrong victim.
35	5	"Carol Bundy and Douglas Clark"	November 2, 2014
A one-night stand turns into a romance from hell after a woman learns of her lover's dark and deadly desires.
36	6	"Charlene and Gerald Gallego"	January 4, 2015
When a sexually charged love affair spins out of control, two lovers go to extreme lengths to satisfy their desires and the consequences are deadly.
37	7	"Mona Watson and Michael Howell"	January 11, 2015
An ex-con and a victim of domestic abuse turn into a modern-day Bonnie and Clyde when their drug-fueled romance leads to a tri-state killing spree.
38	8	"Donna Slaughter and Jason Slaughter"	January 18, 2015
A married couple's twisted scheme is exposed when they conspire to murder the husband's secret lover.
39	9	"Nancy Rish and Danny Edwards"	January 25, 2015
A desperate couple kidnaps a wealthy businessman which leads to murder.
40	10	"Dawn Godman and Justin Helzer"	January 25, 2015
Inspired by a zealous prophet, two lovers set out on a deadly mission to prove their devotion to each other and their bizarre religion.

=== Season 5 (2015) ===
No. overall	No. in season	Title	Original release date
41	1	"Diane Zamora and David Graham"	April 26, 2015
The passionate romance between two academy-bound high school sweethearts turns deadly when a youthful indiscretion leads to cold-blooded murder.
42	2	"Christina Marcum and Jason Singleton"	May 3, 2015
Two obsessed ex-lovers reunite, but their adulterous affair turns deadly when they conspire to get rid of his wife.
43	3	"Samantha Bachynski and Patrick Selepak"	May 10, 2015
A naïve 19-year-old honor student falls in love with an ex-convict, and finds herself part of a sadistic killing spree.
44	4	"Kat McDonough and Seth Mazzaglia"	May 17, 2015
A couple's lifestyle of kink and domination turns deadly when an unwitting college girl enters the picture.
45	5	"Kimberly Michaud and Jimmy Dale Kelley"	May 24, 2015
A small-town mother finds herself captivated by an ex-convict, and soon learns the fatal consequences of being in the wrong place at the wrong time.
46	6	"Miranda and Elytte Barbour"	May 31, 2015
A twisted sense of justice leads a pair of demented newlyweds to lure an unsuspecting victim on Craigslist.
47	7	"Chie Coggins-Johnson and Scott Barker"	June 7, 2015
The son of a wealthy film producer is found stabbed to death in his Beverly Hills mansion.
48	8	"Antoinette Frank and Rogers Lacaze"	June 14, 2015
A scandalous love affair between a police officer and a criminal leads to a bloody triple murder.
49	9	"Kim and Eric Williams"	June 21, 2015
A Texas community is rocked when a series of revenge killings strike the DA's office
50	10	"Susie Newsom and Fritz Klenner"	June 28, 2015
A forbidden affair leaves two lovers determined to keep their relationship a secret-even if it means killing anyone who poses a threat.

=== Season 6 (2015) ===
No. overall	No. in season	Title	Original release date
51	1	"Stephanie Molino and Coty Young"	October 11, 2015
A hostile living environment between feuding couples leaves two dead and an apartment in flames.
52	2	"Harlow Cuadra and Joseph Kerekes"	October 18, 2015
A Virginia couple's desperation leaves their gay porn empire in ashes.
53	3	"Jennifer Pan and Daniel Wong"	October 25, 2015
Overprotective parents lead a love-struck couple down a murderous path.
54	4	"Dena Riley and Richard Davis"	November 1, 2015
A couples' lives heat up as they journey into the world of rough sex and snuff film, but they need some victims to make their dark dreams come true.
55	5	"Diana Haun and Michael Dally"	November 8, 2015
Two love-obsessed grocery store employees find passion among the aisles and come up with a deadly plan to begin their lives together.
56	6	"Brandi Hungerford and Robert Lemke"	November 15, 2015
An Arizona high-roller's luck runs out when two strippers conspire to take his life.
7	7	"Antoinette Stephen and Kashif Parvaiz"	November 22, 2015
When attackers target a family on the side of the road in an apparent hate crime, investigators uncover a crime of passion, lust, and revenge.
58	8	"Cassandra Kimbrough and Antonio Drayton"	November 29, 2015
A red-hot romance comes to a fiery end when jealousy threatens to rip two lovers apart in a crime of passion.
59	9	"Nicole Houchin and John Mackay"	December 6, 2015
Two married couples' infidelity leads to one deadly home invasion, and a shocking investigation that unveils a pair of unlikely suspects.
60	10	"Pamela Smart and Billy Flynn"	December 13, 2015
A sexy teacher and her teenaged lover hatch a plot that rocks a nation.

=== Season 7 (2016) ===
No. overall	No. in season	Title	Original release date
61	1	"Angela Hill and Logan McFarland"	April 3, 2016
A drug-crazed couple set off on a multi-state crime spree; a modern-day Bonnie and Clyde.
62	2	"Leslie and Mike Mackool"	April 10, 2016
When a family member ends up dead, detectives wonder if a money-hungry couple committed the crime or if they've been set up.
63	3	"Ruby Padgett and Mitchell Sims"	April 17, 2016
Two young lovers come up with a murderous revenge plot that will have multiple victims, but a few moments of negligence could turn their entire plan upside down.
64	4	"Katie Belflower and Mike Simons"	April 24, 2016
Before justice can be served in the death of a young bride, the accused murderers reveal a shocking twist that just might get them off the hook.
65	5	"John Hawkins and Gene Hanson"	May 1, 2016
A salesman and a hustler form a business and romantic partnership; when a medical tragedy proves to be unnatural, police uncover a twisted tale of sex, deception and conspiracy.
66	6	"Ny Nourn and Ronald Barker"	May 8, 2016
A withdrawn teen uses online chatrooms as an escape from her abusive home and discovers an attraction to older men, but she soon finds herself trapped in a deadly love triangle with a violent suitor.
67	7	"Victoria and Nathaniel Jackson"	May 15, 2016
When murder strikes a generous multi-millionaire, detectives uncover a mountain of family secrets, a history of sexual abuse and greedy young lovers in the center of it all.
68	8	"Lisa Toney and Sienky Lallemand"	May 22, 2016
A secret life of passion and extravagance is exposed, causing two lovers to take drastic and deadly measures to preserve it.
69	9	"Monserrate Shirley and Mark Leonard"	May 29, 2016
After a fatal gas explosion in a residential community, a divorcee and her new lover find themselves at the center of a twisted conspiracy.
70	10	"Sandy Murphy and Rick Tabish"	June 5, 2016
The sudden death of a Las Vegas casino mogul might not be an accident, but rather the evil doings of his girlfriend and her secret lover.

=== Season 8 (2016) ===
No. overall	No. in season	Title	Original release date
71	1	"Christine Moody and Jeremy Moody"	August 6, 2016
A white supremacist couple's vigilantism ends in a double murder.
72	2	"Catherine Stanek-Cousins and Timothy Koile"	August 13, 2016
A suburban sex scandal uncovers a deadly secret which leads to a missing pilot.
73	3	"Debra Canady and Brent Starr"	August 20, 2016
A cougar and her new boyfriend devise a vicious plot to get rid of an old boyfriend.
74	4	"Peggy Sue Thomas and Jim Huden"	August 27, 2016
A Las Vegas red haired siren and her millionaire boyfriend become suspects in a murder, hundreds of miles away.
75	5	"Michelle Theer and John Diamond"	September 3, 2016
A lonely military wife and psychologist go searching for sex on the Internet with deadly results.
76	6	"Melissa Garcia and Edward Garcia"	September 10, 2016
A couple of drifters befriend a Good Samaritan with horrific results.
77	7	"Heather Mack and Tommy Schaefer"	September 17, 2016
A mother-daughter trip to paradise is cut short by a shocking crime.
78	8	"Danielle Hudson and Chaz Blackshear"	September 24, 2016
In a deadly race against the clock, authorities must piece together a string of murders led by a modern-day Bonnie and Clyde.
79	9	"Carman Jenkins and Clarence Jenkins"	October 1, 2016
A senseless killing leads investigators on a manhunt to uncover the dark and bloody truth behind a couples' deranged.
80	10	"Tanya Bogdanovich and Michael McGregor"	October 8, 2016
A couple takes their kinky sexual fantasies to a dark and deadly place.

=== Season 9 (2018) ===
No. overall	No. in season	Title	Original release date
81	1	"Lee Ann Reidel and Ralph Salierno"	January 13, 2018
A woman and her lover get entangled in a tragic and deadly case of mistaken identity.
82	2	"Amber Dufoe and Richard Oakes"	January 20, 2018
A couple inflicts their own brand of vigilante justice on an enemy from the past.
83	3	"Linda Bury and Joshua Mebane"	January 27, 2018
A plan by teenaged lovers to run away and be together goes horribly wrong.
84	4	"Airika Liljegren and Ryan Martinez"	February 3, 2018
A couple's secret love affair ends in a gruesome double murder.
85	5	"Marie Marone and John Vasquez"	February 17, 2018
A couple's desperation for money and violent sex fantasies lead to a woman's murder.
86	6	"Paige Linville and Mario Moreno"	January 24, 2018
A couple's desire for new thrills take them to deadly heights - twice.
87	7	"Margaret Sanchez and Terry Speaks"	March 3, 2018
A couple kills a former Bourbon Street dancer.
88	8	"Vernell Jones and Kenneth Burno"	March 10, 2018
A couple kills a coworker and plots to kill some of her former lovers.
89	9	"Rose Vincent and Mark Bowling"	March 17, 2018
In a desperate attempt to begin a new life together, two lovers vow to take out the one person who stands between them, true love, and a million-dollar life insurance payout.
90	10	"Alesia Warrior and Darrell Rodgers"	March 24, 2018
A couple's scheme for money and desire doesn't turn out exactly as they had planned.

=== Season 10 (2018–19) ===
No. overall	No. in season	Title	Original release date
91	1	"Kelly Ryan and Craig Titus"	October 7, 2018
A bodybuilding husband and wife find themselves the targets of a murder investigation when a burnt body is found in the desert.
92	2	"Mirinda Boob and Ron Heichel"	October 14, 2018
A wife and mother seeks attention outside her marriage and triggers a deadly chain of events.
93	3	"Kelly Sifuentez and Christian Olsen"	October 21, 2018
A taboo romance between a mother and her daughter's ex-boyfriend becomes the focus of police when two dead bodies are discovered.
94	4	"Keri Murphy and Rebecca Keller"	November 11, 2018
Two teenage lovers fall under suspicion after someone close to them meets a deadly end.
95	5	"Tammy Holman & Charlie Miller"	November 25, 2018
A lonely man longing for affection finds the attention he needs in an unlikely person, but his desire has lethal ramifications.
96	6	"Sam and Collette Collins"	December 2, 2018
A wife's betrayal leaves her jealous husband plotting revenge, and the consequences are deadly.
97	7	"Linda Garcia and Jose Carlos Cruz"	December 9, 2018
Two teen runaways become ensnared in a homicide investigation when someone who disapproved of their relationship is discovered murdered.
98	8	"Sabrina Limon and Jonathan Hearn"	December 30, 2018
A deeply religious woman and her bible-study partner become the primary suspects in an execution-style murder.
99	9	"Allen and Patricia Prue"	January 6, 2019
A man and his wife kidnap and murder a Vermont woman.
100	10	"Tessie McFarland and Joshua Maxwell"	January 13, 2019
Two desperate, young lovers lead investigators on a cross-country manhunt full of murder and mayhem. Now hear directly from one of the suspects in an exclusive interview.

=== Season 11 (2019) ===
No. overall	No. in season	Title	Original release date
101	1	"David Paulson and Meaghan Rice"	January 21, 2019
The discovery of a dead body casts suspicion on an unlikely high school romance.
102	2	"Erika and BJ Sifrit"	January 28, 2019
A vacationing couple's disappearance exposes the horrific crimes of a murderous husband and wife.
103	3	"Toni Fratto & Kody Patten"	February 4, 2019
A high school love triangle turns deadly in Nevada desert.
104	4	"Steven & Sylvia Beersdorf"	February 11, 2019
Grandparents fall under suspicion when their son's fiancée mysteriously disappears.
105	5	"Pamela Lawson & Lekev Spivey"	February 18, 2019
A single mother finds romance with an old friend, but their lives are upended by a deadly secret.
106	6	"Violet & Philip Walter"	February 25, 2019
A young couple becomes the primary suspects in the bizarre death of a police officer.
107	7	"Lynn Hajny & Tommy Douyette"	March 4, 2019
The death of a wealthy businessman exposes a bizarre murder conspiracy.
108	8	"Sherry Engel & Timmy Rogers"	March 11, 2019
A woman's friendship with a younger man falls under suspicion when her husband is brutally murdered.
109	9	"Tia Skinner & Jonathan Kurtz"	March 18, 2019
Desperate teen lovers trigger a deadly chain of events.
110	10	"Melissa Bredow & Jason Belanger"	March 25, 2019
A woman reconnects with her childhood boyfriend, but their rekindled romance falls under suspicion when someone close to them is savagely murdered.

=== Season 12 (2019) ===
No. overall	No. in season	Title	Original release date
111	1	"Gypsy Rose & Nick: A Love to Kill For"	July 13, 2019
Examining the story of Gypsy Rose Blanchard and Nicholas Godejohn and their joint decision to kill Dee Dee Blanchard; featuring an exclusive prison interview with Nicholas Godejohn.
112	2	"Donna Roberts & Nathaniel Jackson"	September 19, 2019
A married woman falls in love with her prison pen pal, but their illicit romance has deadly consequences.
113	3	"Chelsi Griffin & Alex Turner"	September 26, 2019
A young woman finds herself the target of a murder investigation after she befriends a mystery man who claims to be a secret agent with a license to kill.
114	4	"Gina Scramuzza & Carlos Rodriguez"	October 3, 2019
The investigation into the brutal murder of a beloved husband and father exposes a web of lies and infidelity.
115	5	"Blake Leggette and Victoria Henneberry"	October 10, 2019
A pregnant woman's unexplained disappearance casts suspicion on a mysterious couple who recently entered her life.
116	6	"Kim Leblanc & Justin Thomas"	October 17, 2019
The discovery of a burnt body triggers an investigation that unearths a scandalous tale of lust, lies and love triangles.
117	7	"Jesse, Sherry, & Anita Cummings"	October 24, 2019
While investigating the disappearance of two town locals, detectives find themselves in the midst of a tangled web of polygamists.
118	8	"Bill and Sandra Inman"	October 31, 2019
An aspiring preacher and his wife become the primary suspects when their daughter-in-law vanishes without a trace.
119	9	"Joseph and Iryn Meyers"	November 7, 2019
When a beloved neighbor perishes in a suspicious fire, the resulting investigation exposes a deadly conspiracy and two unlikely suspects.
120	10	"Cindy George and John Zaffino"	November 14, 2019
The murder of a husband and father exposes a scandalous love triangle and triggers an investigation into one of the town's wealthiest residents.

=== Season 13 (2020) ===
No. overall	No. in season	Title	Original release date
121	1	"Rachael Mullenix & Ian Allen"	February 13, 2020
When an aspiring actress is found brutally murdered, authorities discover family secrets and a forbidden love affair.
122	2	"Cindy Beck & Andrew Jondle"	February 20, 2020
Farmer couple brutally murdered, setting off an investigation that exposes a startling motive fueled by lust and desperation.
123	3	"Kristel Maestas & Ronald Bell"	February 27, 2020
Air Force veteran falls victim to unthinkable crime; search for the truth reveals a twisted tale of revenge and two suspects no one expected.
124	4	"Kelly Gissendaner & Greg Owen"	March 5, 2020
A loving husband and father goes missing, triggering a police investigation that uncovers an illicit romance fueled by deadly passion.
125	5	"Melanie Ray & Chandler Clark"	March 12, 2020
A good Samaritan falls victim to a brutal crime, leading police on a manhunt for a pair of killers fueled by envy and rage.
126	6	"Erin Caffey & Charlie Wilkinson"	March 19, 2020
When a family falls victim to a devastating crime, the search for the killers lays bare a twisted romance and a motive no one can believe.
127	7	"Charlene Childers & Timothy Dean"	March 26, 2020
A loving couple is gunned down outside their home, setting in motion a cross-country investigation to track down an unlikely killer and a motive for revenge.
128	8	"Kemia Hassel and Jeremy Cuellar"	April 2, 2020
After a soldier is murdered on New Year's Eve, the quest for the truth reveals a deadly plot driven by temptation and obsession.
129	9	"Jennifer Shanbrom and Matt Fletcher"	April 9, 2020
A beloved police officer's murder takes years for his brothers in blue to solve, ultimately revealing a conspiracy born out of lust and greed.
130	10	"Patricia Teeter & Steven Brown"	April 16, 2020
A shocking double murder and kidnapping springs police into action to stop a pair of deadly lovers before they can kill again; a surviving victim recounts the harrowing ordeal.

=== Season 14 (2020) ===
No. overall	No. in season	Title	Original release date
131	1	"Patrick Frazee and Krystal Kenney"	February 13, 2020
When Colorado mother, Kelsey Berreth, disappeared in 2018, the search for her would uncover a secret romance that burned with deadly passion; featuring exclusive interviews with Kelsey's family friends and the investigators who broke the case.
132	2	"Jordan Hodge and Kenny Carlisle"	June 25, 2020
A beloved grandmother and her new husband go missing, triggering an investigation that reveals a twisted tale of first love and a motive fueled by obsession and greed.
133	3	"Antoinette Martinez and Cameo Clines"	July 2, 2020
A horrific killing spree in Texas sets off an investigation that uncovers a sordid web of seduction and a pair of killers driven by greed and bloodlust.
134	4	"Teresa Lewis and Matthew Shallenberger"	July 9, 2020
When a husband and his adult son are murdered during a violent home invasion, the search for the killers exposes an illicit romance and family betrayal no one saw coming.
135	5	"Tyonne Palmer and Tracy Burleson"	July 16, 2020
When a preacher's wife is gunned down outside her home in Houston, investigators uncover a sordid web of sin and sex.
136	6	"Sonia Weidenfelder and Rick Spaulding"	July 23, 2020
The home invasion murder of a young mother in Oklahoma launches an investigation that reveals a vengeful romance and a murder conspiracy rooted in obsession and greed.
137	7	"Brooklyn Reynolds and Christopher Evans"	July 30, 2020
When a loving couple are murdered in their home, the investigation uncovers a forbidden romance between two young lovers willing to do anything to get what they desire.
138	8	"Jenna Oakley and Kenneth Nigh"	August 6, 2020
The brutal murder of a woman inside her Kentucky home triggers an investigation that reveals an underage romance fueled by obsession and rage.
139	9	"Carol Giles and Tim Collier"	August 13, 2020
When a woman's body is discovered in a town park, the investigation into what happened exposes a sordid tale of lust, torture and two cases of cold-blooded murder.
140	10	"Michael Ivezic and Demitry Papasoutiriou"	August 20, 2020
When a respected Toronto bookkeeper is found murdered inside his home, the search for his killer focuses on two unexpected suspects and unearths shocking allegations of sex, scandal and a deadly betrayal.

=== Season 15 (2021) ===
No. overall	No. in season	Title	Original release date
141	1	"Ailsa Jackson and Michael Walker"	May 23, 2021
When the wife of an Army medic is murdered in her Hawaii home, the investigation reveals a sordid tale of secrets, lies and a twisted romance that captured headlines across the country.
142	2	"Carmen Stonemark and James Deese"	May 24, 2021
The disappearance of a well-respected businessman leads to an investigation that exposes a secret romance fueled by lust and greed.
143	3	"Barbara Raber and Eli Weaver"	May 25, 2021
An Amish community is turned upside down when a young wife and mother is found murdered inside her home, leading police to look deeper within the community, and exposing a secret romance that triggered a deadly conspiracy.
144	4	"Kaleigh Fryer and Jay Chiles"	May 26, 2021
A beloved Oklahoma father is discovered murdered inside his home and the search for his killer uncovers a forbidden romance and a deadly double-cross.
145	5	"Carolyn King and Bradley Martin"	May 27, 2021
A young couple becomes the target of a nationwide manhunt after police connect the deadly lovers to two grisly murders in different states.
146	6	"Mark Spotz and Christina Noland"	May 28, 2021
A horrific killing spree leads Pennsylvania investigators on the hunt for two young lovers willing to do whatever it takes to evade the law.
147	7	"Kyle Navin and Jennifer Valiante"	June 4, 2021
The sudden disappearance of a wealthy couple rattles their small town and launches an investigation that exposes a web of deception, greed and a blood-soaked betrayal.
148	8	"Kristi Koslow and Brian Salter"	June 11, 2021
When a wealthy couple falls victim to a deadly home invasion, the search for the killers exposes both a twisted relationship and a family betrayal no one saw coming.
149	9	"De'Asia Page and Jared Kemp"	June 18, 2021
When a beloved grandmother falls victim to a brutal crime, the search for her killers reveals a torrid romance between two young lovers willing to do anything to get what they desire.
150	10	"Alice and Gerald Uden"	June 25, 2021
The unexplained disappearances of a young mother and her two sons in 1980 lead investigators on a three-decade quest for justice, exposing multiple murders and a homicidal love affair that left untold suffering and carnage in its wake.

=== Season 16 (2022) ===
No. overall	No. in season	Title	Original release date
151	1	"Afton Ferris and Michael Schallert"	April 17, 2022
A loving couple are found shot to death in their home, forcing police to pursue a pair of desperate lovers on a cross-country manhunt.
152	2	"Lori Smith & Eric Rubio and Amy Stevens & Paul Smith"	April 24, 2022
When a young woman is found tortured and killed after a camping trip with friends, police must unravel two couples' conflicting stories of depravity to bring her killers to justice.
153	3	"Heather Kamp & Ethan Mack"	May 1, 2022
The disappearance of a young socialite in Charleston prompts a team of private investigators to unearth a betrayal at the hands of her two best friends, one of whom is a con artist with a secret.
154	4	"Kadie Robinson & Ronnie Welborn"	May 8, 2022
When a single mother is found murdered in her home, the investigation exposes a twisted love triangle and a murder-for-hire scheme devised to kill the competition.
155	5	"Nancy & Trey Styler"	May 15, 2022
The ritzy ski resort town of Aspen, Colo., is turned upside down when a celebrated socialite is found murdered in her home, leading investigators to uncover a bitter feud between friends.
156	6	"Dolores Delgado & Maliek Kearney"	May 22, 2022
The brutal murder of a young Army specialist leads investigators to explore a complicated love affair fueled by obsession and jealousy.
157	7	"Francesca Kiel & Ralph Keppler"	May 29, 2022
When a beloved schoolteacher is violently assaulted outside her home, police discover a toxic romance that destroyed a family's bond.
158	8	"Thadeshia Clark & Omar Savior"	June 5, 2022
The disappearance of a well-respected Georgia man triggers an investigation into the dangers of online dating and reveals a disturbing plot borne of lust and greed.
159	9	"Robin Radcliff & Gary Hinojosa"	June 12, 2022
When a Navy man falls victim to a deadly home invasion, the search for his killers exposes both a sordid romance and a deadly conspiracy within his own ranks.
160	10	"Kim & Lenorris Williams"	June 19, 2022
The horrific attack of a beloved spiritual leader takes an investigation into a dark underworld of black magic and unbridled rage.

=== Season 17 (2023–24) ===
No. overall	No. in season	Title	Original release date
161	1	"Jeffrey Mundt & Joey Banis"	June 11, 2023
When police are called to a seemingly routine domestic disturbance at a mansion in Louisville, a bizarre tale unravels after one man reveals a body is buried in their basement.
162	2	"U'Dreka Andrews & Danny Brown"	June 18, 2023
As police in Tallahassee, Fla., work to solve the case of a young father gunned down in his apartment, they find evidence of a deadly sexual encounter and uncover a vengeful plot, ultimately proving that blood is thicker than water.
163	3	"Charles Chumbler & Michael Kariakis"	June 25, 2023
The murder of a beloved schoolteacher takes detectives from Kentucky to Florida, where an unexpected romance comes to light; as the investigation unfolds, relationships unravel, and a long con born of greed is unveiled.
164	4	"Liz Rogan & Tony DePuisaye-Greene"	July 2, 2023
A man is found shot dead in his home, which shocks his small-town neighbourhood. At first, the police suspect that it has to do with his complicated love life, but a string of robberies leads them to a couple who might be responsible for it.
165	5	"Nadya Swartz & Justin Hooker"	July 9, 2023
Investigators search for answers to the murder of a young man on the bank of a Georgia River. They trace the crime back to individuals who share the victim's Gothic lifestyle and uncover a romantic rivalry driven by manipulation.
166	6	"Jennifer Smith & Dale Moneypenny"	July 16, 2023
A house fire in Louisville, Ky., sparks a murder investigation when detectives find two local men brutally stabbed to death; the search for the killer reveals a toxic romance between two lovers willing to risk it all to get what they desire.
167	7	"Susan & Blane Barksdale"	July 23, 2023
An elderly veteran is nowhere to be found after his house suddenly bursts into flames in Tucson, Arizona. When the couple suspected to have committed the crime goes on the run, authorities kickstart a nationwide manhunt to track them down.
168	8	"Ilene Lazar & Francis Riccio"	July 30, 2023
After the remains of an elderly woman are discovered in Florida, investigators track down suspects with a complex family dynamic. The woman at the centre of it tells her story for the first time, revealing details of the harrowing crime.
169	9	"Britney Overton & Justin Blake"	August 6, 2023
When a young man is found shot to death off the side of a rural in rural Indiana, the ensuing investigation delves into the dangers of online dating. Authorities ultimately uncover a stunning betrayal fuelled by a twisted romance.
170	10	"Xaveriana Cook & Hunter Carlstrom"	August 13, 2023
A 61-year-old farmhand is found murdered in his home on the outskirts of the Ozarks; a strange text message points to a suspect, but the investigation quickly diverges after a duo on the run is exposed, resulting in a fatal shootout in Mississippi.
171	11	"Ellen Friar & Gavin MacFarlane"	March 3, 2024
A father and daughter are reported missing after evidence of a bloody attack is found in their home; as the investigation unfolds, police interview a trio of suspects and their conflicting stories reveal a twisted plot driven by infatuation.
172	12	"Shayne Lovera & Brett Rae"	March 10, 2024
A professor is found dead inside his Jeep in what appears to be a car accident in Tennessee; after evidence at the scene points to foul play, the ensuing investigation exposes secrets of infidelity and a crime motivated by lust and money.
173	13	"Shanika Robinson & Isiah Genus"	March 17, 2024
An immigrant from Pakistan is found brutally murdered inside his Washington, D.C., pizzeria; given the lack of forced entry, investigators believe he knew his killer and a plot involving marriage fraud surfaces, leading to a deadly crime of passion.
174	14	"Jennifer Bailey & Paul Henson"	March 24, 2024
Texas police investigating the stabbing death of a mother uncover a bizarre scene: poisoned pudding, cell phones submerged in water, and a bathtub rigged for electrocution; in the end, a disturbing plan is revealed, driven by a young love gone wrong.
175	15	"Amanda Noverr & Adam Williams"	April 7, 2024
When RV-lifestyle couple James and Michelle Butler go missing while camping along the southern coast of Texas, the discovery of human remains leads authorities to embark on an international manhunt to bring the fugitives to justice.
176	16	"Patricia Sexton & Michael Fielding"	April 7, 2024
After a father is reported missing, a body is discovered in a remote Texan swamp; investigators are faced with several possible suspects as complex family dynamics come into play that expose a secret betrayal.
177	17	"Brenda Dixon & Elbert Holder"	April 14, 2024
Just one month before her wedding, a nurse is shot to death in a reported roadside robbery in rural Arkansas; as investigators work to find the suspects, odd details of the attack are uncovered and a confession paints an entirely different story.
178	18	"Crystal Brinson & Byron Boutin"	April 21, 2024
Hunters stumble across a young woman's decaying body wrapped in fabric, launching an investigation across several counties in Florida. Horrific rumours quickly swirl and a night of partying that morphed into an act of desperation is revealed.
179	19	"Patricia Aldridge & Mitchell Vickers"	April 28, 2024
After evidence of a violent attack is discovered in a West Virginia home, the body of a beloved photojournalist is found in the woods; the search for the killer reveals a sordid affair and a murder-for-hire plot with a shocking co-conspirator.
180	20	"Monica Diaz & Michael Naranjo"	May 5, 2024
In the Los Angeles suburbs, a family is brutally attacked in their residence, leaving four dead and a mother clinging to life. As police search for answers, suspicion will grow closer to home and unveil a macabre obsession fuelled by young love.

=== Season 18 (2025–26) ===
No. overall	No. in season	Title	Original release date
181	1	"Maya Maxwell and Cedric Marks"	March 2, 2025
182	2	"Cynthia and Richie Wilder"	March 9, 2025
183	3	"Alison Martin and Justin Terpstra"	March 16, 2025
184	4	"Laura Martin and Robert Quinn"	March 23, 2025
185	5	"Angelita Reyes and Jesus Jeronimo"	April 6, 2025
186	6	"Adrienne Simpson and Tyler Terry"	April 13, 2025
187	7	"Holly Elkins and Andrew Beard"	April 20, 2025
188	8	"Brinlee Denison and Nicholas Johnson"	May 4, 2025
189	9	"Raquel Garajau and Joseph Villani"	May 11, 2025
190	10	"Ashley Coleman and Hakeem Griffin-White"	May 18, 2025
191	11	"Amanda Lothery and Rajhi "T.C." Render"	May 3, 2026
192	12	"Anna Schroeder and Rachel Helm"	May 10, 2026
193	13	"Michelle Hetzel and Brandon Bloss"	May 17, 2026
194	14	"Devonnee and Malik Wilkerson"	May 24, 2026
195	15	"Melissa Schafer and William Baer"	May 31, 2026
196	16	"Christina Araujo and Zach Abell"	June 7, 2026
197	17	"Casandra Nazario and Miles Johnson"	June 14, 2026
198	18	"Linda Buckner and Walter Renz"	June 21, 2026
199	19	"Elsa Segura and Lyndon Wiggins"	June 28, 2026
200	20	"Raminder Kaur And Baldeo Taneja"	July 12, 2026
