= Knotek =

Knotek (feminine Knotková) is a Czech surname. It may refer to:

- Ivan Knotek, Slovak politician
- Jaroslav Knotek, Czech athlete
- Kyle Knotek, American soccer player
- Michelle Knotek, American murderer
- Ondřej Knotek, Czech politician
- Tomáš Knotek, Czech ice hockey player
