= Lululemon murder =

2011 murder in Bethesda, Maryland, US

- Date: March 11, 2011
- Location: 4856 Bethesda Ave, Bethesda, Maryland, U.S.
- Cause: Multiple injuries
- Participants: Brittany Norwood
- Outcome: Convicted of first-degree murder
- Deaths: Jayna Troxel Murray

The Lululemon murder occurred on March 11, 2011, at a Lululemon store located in the Washington, D.C. suburb of Bethesda, Maryland, when store employee Brittany Norwood murdered her coworker Jayna Troxel Murray. The case received widespread media coverage and was commonly referred to as the "Lululemon murder." In January 2012, Norwood was sentenced to life imprisonment without the possibility of parole.

== Murder ==
On the morning of March 12, 2011, a manager in the store where Murray worked arrived to find the door unlocked, merchandise strewn across the floor, and mannequins in disarray. She heard someone moaning near the back of the store. Frightened, she asked a man outside to help her search the store. He found Jayna Murray lying dead in a back hallway, face down in a pool of blood, with a ligature around her neck. Brittany Norwood was found in the bathroom, apparently semi-conscious, with zipties binding her wrists and ankles and blood on her face. Bloody footprints were tracked through the store. The manager then called 9-1-1.

Norwood told police that after she and Murray closed the store the previous evening, she realized she had forgotten her wallet and called Murray to let her back into the store. Alarm records showed that the door was unlocked at 10:05 pm. Then, according to Norwood, two men wearing dark clothing and ski masks entered, attacked them, and sexually assaulted them. While police initially treated Norwood as a victim, it soon became clear that the evidence did not support her account. Murray had been savagely attacked, sustaining at least 331 wounds from at least five different weapons, including a knife and a hammer, which may have come from a toolbox in the store. Norwood's injuries were relatively minor, and appeared consistent with self-inflicted wounds. A forensic expert at the trial testified that the blood on her face, from a cut on her forehead, had dripped straight down, suggesting that she was upright most of the night, not lying on the bathroom floor where she was found. The bloody footprints in the store came from two pairs of shoes—a pair of men's size 14 Reebok sneakers, which were found inside the store, and Norwood's own shoes. It was discovered that the tracks ended before either exit from the store. Additionally, investigators found no evidence that either woman was sexually assaulted, although Norwood had cut a hole in Murray's pants to make it appear that she had been.

During the investigation, it came to light that an employee and a manager at the Apple Store next door heard an altercation through the wall the previous evening; surveillance footage from inside the Apple Store shows them standing next to the shared wall, then walking away, while a security guard sits nearby listening to music on an iPod. The employee testified at Norwood's trial that she heard women arguing, one saying "Talk to me. Don't do this. Talk to me. What's going on?", followed by screams, sounds of something or someone being hit or dragged, and a weak voice saying "God help me...please help me." The manager testified that he thought the noise was "just drama."

Police also found blood in Murray's car, which was identified at the trial as a mix of Norwood's blood and Murray's. Norwood admitted to moving her car, which was found at a farmer's market three blocks away. She claimed the men ordered her to, and told her that if she didn't come back in 10 minutes, they would kill her. She also said that she saw a police officer while she was moving the vehicle, but did not speak to him.

Norwood was arrested a week after the slaying, and charged with first-degree murder. Statements by police officials and testimony during the trial indicated that on the evening of the murder, Murray and Norwood checked each others' bags for unpaid merchandise, a routine security procedure at Lululemon and other retail stores. Murray found a pair of pants in Norwood's bag, and called the manager after she left the store. The manager said she would deal with it in the morning. A few minutes later, Norwood called Murray to say she'd forgotten something, and asked Murray to return to the store and let her in. When Murray arrived, Norwood attacked her, moved her car, then staged the scene to look like a robbery. Norwood put on a pair of men's shoes to track blood across the floor; tossing mops, broom, and chairs around the store; cut herself; and bound her own wrists and ankles with zipties.

On January 27, 2012, Norwood was sentenced to life in prison for first degree murder. She is now at the Maryland Correctional Institution for Women.

== In the media ==
The murder was covered in a number of true crime podcasts, including Morbid and Generation Why. It was also the subject of a 2012 episode of Snapped, a 2014 episode of Redrum, a 2022 episode of Casefile, a 2023 episode of Autopsy, a 2023 episode of Forensic Files II, and a 2023 episode of Murder in the 21st.

In 2013, The Washington Post police reporter Dan Morse published the book, The Yoga Store Murder: The Shocking True Account of the Lululemon Athletica Killing.

== See also ==
- Starbucks murders
- Crime in Maryland
