= Josh Ford (disambiguation) =

Josh Ford (born 1987) is an American soccer player.

Josh or Joshua Ford may also refer to:

- Joshua Ford (died 2002), American murder victim of Erika and Benjamin Sifrit
- Josh Ford (actor) (born 2005), Filipino-British actor
- Josh Ford, fictional character in the TV series Popular
