= Murder of Girly Chew Hossencofft =

American murder case

Girly Chew Hossencofft
- Girly Chew in c. 1991
- Born: Girly Chew; August 27, 1963; George Town, Penang, Malaysia
- Disappeared: September 9, 1999 (aged 36); Albuquerque, New Mexico
- Parents: Chew Shing Kheng (father); Margaret Chin Geok Wan (mother)
- Relatives: June Chew (sister); Andrew Chew (brother)

Girly Chew Hossencofft (August 27, 1963 – September 9, 1999) was a Malaysian woman who disappeared on September 9, 1999, in Albuquerque, New Mexico. The investigation into the murder of Girly Chew revealed a conspiracy theory involving reptilian queens, UFOs and reports of cannibalism. Girly Chew's husband Diazien Hossencofft and his girlfriend Linda Henning were convicted of her murder. Her body has never been found.

== Victim ==
Girly Chew was born on August 27, 1963, in Tanjung Bungah, Penang, to Malaysian Chinese parents. During a visit to the United States in the early 1990s, she met Diazien Hossencofft at SeaWorld. In 1993, Girly and Diazien married. They resided in Albuquerque, New Mexico, where Girly was employed as a bank teller. In January 1999, Girly moved out of the couple's home and filed for divorce after a domestic violence incident where Diazien had threatened to kill her. She confided in her co-workers that she was afraid of her husband after she learned he had lied to her about his career as a doctor and was using a fake name.

== Perpetrators ==
Diazien Hossencofft was born Armand Chavez in Houston, Texas, on March 5, 1965. He falsely claimed that he was a thoracic surgeon with degrees from the University of Tokyo and Cornell Medical College. In reality, he was a con artist and complete fraud who had doctored his transcripts and was expelled from medical school. Following his expulsion, he changed his name to Diazien Hossencofft and married Girly Chew. Diazien continued to trick people into believing he was a geneticist who claimed to have leukemia; he sold fake cancer treatments to clients, who would pay thousands of dollars for anti-aging injections. In 1996, he fathered a son with a Japanese woman living in Canada. In 1999, while still married to his wife Girly, he was engaged to three different women, including Linda Henning.

Linda Henning was born on October 10, 1953, in Hollywood, California. After high school, she worked as a fashion model, and later became a successful fashion designer. In 1999, Henning met Diazien, and she quickly broke up with her fiance and became engaged to Diazien. Henning and Diazien shared an interest in government conspiracy theories and UFOs.

== Crime and investigation ==
On the morning of September 10, 1999, Girly Chew failed to show up for work. Her co-workers immediately became concerned about Girly's welfare and reported her missing that day. Diazien Hossencofft was the prime suspect in the investigation, but he had left for Charleston, South Carolina, that very day. Investigators then focused their attention on Girly Chew's apartment and Diazien Hossencofft's girlfriend, Linda Henning. Inside Girly's apartment, the investigators noticed the smell of bleach. Using luminol, they found considerable blood evidence.

Following the search of Girly Chew's apartment, police questioned Henning, who appeared as a personal reference of Diazien. In her interview, she claimed that she believed that Diazien was an accomplished doctor and that she had no knowledge of Girly Chew's disappearance. She later stated to an investigative grand jury that she did not even know Diazien's missing wife, but police were able to prove that she was lying. Investigators showed that Henning had banked at the branch where Girly worked, and that Girly had been Henning's teller on at least one occasion. Henning was charged with perjury for lying to the grand jury in October 1999.

In Henning's home, investigators recovered a ninja sword in her attic, which was purchased on the morning of Girly's murder. Days after Girly Chew's disappearance, her clothing was found on a tarpaulin in Belen, New Mexico. Along with Girly's clothing, investigators discovered a piece of duct tape with Henning's hair attached. She and Diazien Hossencofft were indicted and charged with murder.

== Trial ==
In January 2002, in an effort to avoid the death penalty, Diazien Hossencofft pleaded guilty to the murder of his wife. In exchange for his plea bargain, he was sentenced to life in prison plus 61 years to be served in Wyoming State Penitentiary.

Linda Henning's murder trial began in September 2002, more than three years after Girly Chew's disappearance. The trial was later televised on CourtTV. She was the first woman in New Mexico history to face capital punishment. Henning's friends believed that she had been brainwashed and drugged by Diazien. Onlookers noted Henning's strange actions as forensic investigators testified for the prosecution.

During the trial, Linda Henning's attorneys Gary Mitchell and Monica Baca called Diazien Hossencofft to testify in Henning's defense. On the stand, he proclaimed that he had masterminded the murder of his wife and that Henning was completely innocent. He claimed that a man named Bill Miller was Girly Chew's true killer, and not Henning as prosecutors had theorized. Bill Miller was charged in the investigation but only with five counts of tampering with evidence.

Regarding Henning's blood found in Girly's apartment, Diazien had claimed that he planted her blood there. Although Diazien testified that he planted Henning's blood in an effort to confuse investigators, Henning's attorney claimed Diazien meant to frame Henning for the crime.

== Verdict ==
On October 25, 2002, Linda Henning was found guilty of first degree murder. She was also convicted of kidnapping, conspiracy to kidnap, tampering with evidence, and four counts of perjury. Due to the special circumstances of felony murder and kidnapping, Henning faced the death penalty.

Henning's sentencing was held on April 18, 2003. Before her sentencing date, prosecutor Paul Spiers wrote in his presentence investigation report that she "had made statements that she had actually consumed the flesh of Girly Chew and that, as a consequence, her remains and body would never be recovered by authorities." Henning was sentenced to 73 years in prison.

For his role in the crime, Bill Miller received one year of probation.

== Aftermath ==
Albuquerque television journalist Mark Horner wrote and published a book in 2004 about the murder of Girly Chew, entitled September Sacrifice.

In 2010, Linda Henning's perjury convictions were overturned by the New Mexico Supreme Court; however, all of her other convictions and her sentence were affirmed.

The story of Girly Chew's murder has been televised on Crime Stories, Court TV, American Justice, Snapped, and Sins and Secrets, among other programs.

In January 2020, Diazien Hossencofft made a request to a judge to vacate his life sentence, claiming that prosecutors and police colluded to hide evidence that would have exonerated both him and Henning. In a statement to Judge Alisa Hart, Hossencofft's attorney asked for a six-month extension to collect evidence involving "global connections", which was granted.

In October 2026, a judge found that Linda Henning had not been competent to stand trial for the murder of Girly Chew and ordered a retrial. The judge further denied the prosecution’s motion to hold Henning pending retrial, instead ordering Henning be released without an ankle monitor.

== See also ==
- List of incidents of cannibalism
- List of solved missing person cases: 1950–1999
