= King of the Jungle (TV series) =

- Directed by: Steven J. Santos
- Presented by: Jeff Corwin
- Judges: Nigel Marven
- Country of origin: United States
- Original language: English
- No. of seasons: 3

Production
- Production locations: Fort Pierce, Florida
- Production company: Jupiter Entertainment

Original release
- Network: Animal Planet
- Release: October 13, 2003 – July 27, 2004

King of the Jungle is an American reality television program that aired on the Animal Planet. The original series debuted in 2003 and starred a group of 12 "animal experts" and was hosted by Jeff Corwin. In it, each "expert" had to face a number of physical challenges pertaining to the outdoors or wildlife in some fashion.
