= Michelle Knotek =

American convicted murderer (b. 1954)

- Born: Michelle Watson; April 15, 1954 (age 72); Raymond, Washington, U.S.
- Other names: Michelle L. Knotek, Shelly Knotek.
- Status: Released
- Convictions: Second degree murder First degree manslaughter
- Penalty: 22 years imprisonment

Details
- Victims: 2–3
- Span of crimes: 1993–2003
- Country: United States
- State: Washington
- Date apprehended: August 8, 2003

Michelle Knotek is an American convicted murderer from Raymond, Washington. She was convicted in 2004 of second degree murder and first degree manslaughter for her role in the torture and deaths of Kathy Loreno and Ronald Woodworth, who were both boarders in Knotek's home. Her husband, David Knotek, was also convicted of the murder of her 17-year-old nephew Shane Watson, who lived with the Knoteks. Michelle is also suspected of possible involvement in the death of James McClintock, an 81-year-old whose assets she inherited after he died of head trauma incurred while Knotek was employed as his caregiver on February 9, 2002. The Knoteks' crimes made national headlines due to allegations of abuse and torture.

Michelle Knotek was sentenced to 22 years in prison. She served approximately 18 years at the Washington Corrections Center for Women in Gig Harbor and was released on November 8, 2022. Her husband David Knotek was sentenced to 15 years in prison. He served approximately 13 years at the Monroe Correctional Complex before being paroled in 2016.

== Victims ==
=== Kathy Loreno, 36 ===
Kathy Loreno was a hairdresser working in South Bend, Washington, when she met Michelle Knotek, and the two became friends. In 1991 after an argument between Loreno and her family, Loreno moved out of their home and into the home of Michelle and David Knotek. During her stay at the Knoteks' home, it was alleged that Loreno suffered physical abuse. In 1994, Loreno was reported missing by family members. When interviewed by authorities, the Knoteks stated that Loreno had run away with a truck driver and moved to California.

Michelle Knotek maintained that she and Loreno were in regular contact. However, a private investigator hired by Loreno's brother concluded that she had probably been murdered by Michelle Knotek. David Knotek claimed that Loreno died by asphyxiating on her own vomit, but he did not take her to a hospital or report her death to police because of the physical injuries to Loreno's body.

=== Shane Watson, 19 ===
Shane Watson, born in 1975 in Tacoma, was Michelle Knotek's nephew. Watson moved in with the Knoteks around 1988. Shortly after Loreno's disappearance in 1994, Watson seemingly vanished too. The Knoteks initially claimed that Watson had run away to Alaska to work on a fishing vessel. David Knotek later claimed that he had shot Watson with a .22 caliber rifle.

Investigators alleged that David Knotek killed Watson because Michelle was enraged that Watson took pictures documenting the abuse of Loreno. David Knotek also stated that he burned the bodies of Shane Watson and Kathy Loreno and scattered their ashes at the beach.

=== Ronald Woodworth, 57 ===
Ronald Woodworth was a local man who went to live with the Knoteks around 2001. Like Kathy Loreno, Woodworth was also subject to severe physical abuse. Witnesses described seeing Woodworth being forced to do chores outside wearing only his underwear, and to jump from the second story roof onto gravel, wearing nothing on his feet, causing broken bones and severe lacerations. They also claimed that Michelle Knotek would burn Woodworth's injured feet with boiling water and pure bleach.

Woodworth went missing in 2003. David Knotek later admitted to burying Woodworth's body on their property after Michelle told him that Woodworth had committed suicide. An autopsy performed by the King County medical examiner determined that Woodworth's death was murder.

== Sentencing ==
The Pacific County Deputy Prosecutor stated that Michelle Knotek showed "extreme indifference to human life". Michelle was charged with two counts of first-degree murder in the deaths of Kathy Loreno and Ronald Woodworth. David Knotek was charged with first-degree murder in the death of Shane Watson. He was also charged with rendering criminal assistance and unlawful disposal of human remains.

Through plea negotiations, both Knoteks pleaded guilty to lesser charges in 2004. Michelle Knotek entered an Alford plea, in which she did not admit responsibility but acknowledged the prosecutor's case against her. She pleaded guilty to one count of second-degree murder and one count of manslaughter. While an initial agreement with prosecutors would have sent her to prison for 17 years, Judge Mark McCauley sentenced her to 22 years in prison. Michelle Knotek appealed her convictions, but was denied by the Washington Court of Appeals. She served approximately 18 years at the Washington Corrections Center for Women in Gig Harbor and was released on November 8, 2022.

David Knotek was sentenced to 15 years in prison for the second-degree murder of Shane Watson. He served approximately 13 years at the Monroe Correctional Complex before being paroled in 2016.

== In the media ==
The Knotek cases have been featured on several television programs, including Wicked Attraction, Sins and Secrets and Snapped.

A book by true crime author Gregg Olsen, If You Tell: A True Story of Murder, Family Secrets, and the Unbreakable Bond of Sisterhood, was published in 2019.

== See also ==
- List of serial killers in the United States
