= Konstantinos Fotopoulos =

Greek prisoner and convicted murderer on Florida's death row

- Κώστας Φωτόπουλος
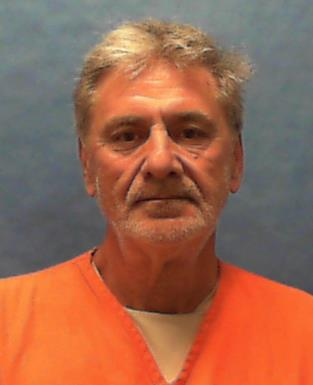
- Born: Konstantinos X. Fotopoulos; July 26, 1959 (age 67); Athens, Kingdom of Greece
- Other names: Kosta Fotopoulos; Konstantin O. Fotopoulos
- Status: Incarcerated on death row
- Convictions: First-degree murder (x2); Attempted first-degree murder (x2); Accessory to first-degree murder (x2); Conspiracy to commit first-degree murder Burglary
- Penalty: Death
- Accomplices: Deidre Hunt (Sentenced to death; commuted to life imprisonment); Bryan Chase (Killed by Fotopoulos)

Details
- Span of crimes: October 20, 1989 – November 4, 1989
- Country: United States
- State: Florida
- Location: Daytona Beach
- Killed: Bryan L. Chase, 18; Kevin Ramsey, 19; Augustine Paspalakis, 64 (claimed)
- Injured: Lisa Paspalakis, 29
- Imprisoned at: Union Correctional Institution

Konstantinos X. Fotopoulos (Greek: Κώστας Φωτόπουλος; born July 26, 1959) is a Greek businessman and convicted murderer who was found guilty of two murders in Daytona Beach, Florida. In October 1989, Fotopoulos and his girlfriend, Deidre Hunt, first killed 19-year-old Kevin Ramsey, who was lured into the woods and tied to a tree before Hunt fatally shot him while Fotopoulos videotaped the killing. Subsequently, Fotopoulos and Hunt plotted to kill Fotopoulos's wife and hired 18-year-old Bryan Chase to carry out the murder. In November 1989, Chase broke into Fotopoulos's home and shot his wife, but she survived. Afterwards, Fotopoulos shot and killed Chase. Fotopoulos and Hunt were both arrested, tried, and sentenced to death for first-degree murder, although Hunt's sentence was later commuted to life imprisonment. Fotopoulos remains on death row as of 2026.

== Personal life ==
Konstantinos Fotopoulos was born in Athens, Greece, on July 26, 1959, and was the second son of an executive with Olympic Airways. Around 1980, he moved to the United States to study at Embry–Riddle Aeronautical University in Daytona Beach, Florida, where he pursued a master's degree. While working as a waiter at a barbercue shop in 1985, he met accountant Lisa Paspalakis, whom he married within months. Paspalakis was born and raised in Daytona Beach, where her parents first settled after immigrating from Greece, and she graduated from both Seabreeze High School and the University of South Florida, where she obtained a degree in accountancy. After graduating, Fotopoulos joined the Paspalakis family's businesses, including an amusement park and several gift shops, earning $320 a week while living with his wife and her family.

By 1987, Fotopoulos had become involved in a counterfeiting operation involving fake $100 bills, and he was later convicted on federal counterfeiting charges for this case. During this period, he also developed an intense fascination with firearms, military culture, and espionage. He amassed a collection of guns, regularly read Soldier of Fortune magazine, applied unsuccessfully to the CIA in 1988, and reportedly asked for a secret room to be built into his new home. Witnesses said he buried guns and counterfeit money in wooded areas, dressed in camouflage while carrying multiple weapons, claimed to be a "commando assassin," and promoted a self-styled "Hunter-Killer Club." In 1989, against his wife's wishes, he opened the Top Shots pool hall on the Daytona Beach Boardwalk, where he became acquainted with many local drifters, including Deidre Hunt, who would later become his lover and accomplice in two murder cases.

== Murders ==
=== Kevin Ramsay ===
On October 20, 1989, Konstantinos Fotopoulos first killed 19-year-old Kevin Ramsey, who was driven to an isolated rifle range by Fotopoulos and Hunt. According to Hunt's testimony, Fotopoulos apparently forced and coerced Hunt at gunpoint to shoot and kill Ramsey or she would have to die. Ramsey, who believed that he was taken for initiation into a club, was taken to the forest, where he was tied to a tree. Ramsey was subsequently shot four times by Hunt with a .22 caliber firearm, consisting of three times in the chest and once in the head, and Fotopoulos videotaped the shooting. After this, Fotopoulos wielded an AK-47 rifle and shot Ramsey once in the head. Investigations later uncovered that prior to his death, Ramsey allegedly blackmailed Fotopoulos regarding an unrelated counterfeiting scheme, which formed the probable motive behind Ramsey's murder.

Sometime after the murder of Ramsey, Fotopoulos made use of the videotape to coerce Hunt into helping him to plan and carry out the plot of killing his wife. The body of Ramsey was found on November 8, 1989, and the tape was found inside the house of Fotopoulos two weeks after he was arrested for plotting the murder attempt of his wife.

=== Bryan Chase ===
Throughout the next two weeks after the murder of Ramsey, Fotopoulos and Hunt plotted to kill the former's wife, in order to receive $700,000 worth of insurance payouts for Lisa Paspalakis's death. On October 30, 1989, Hunt hired her 20-year-old friend Teja James and promised to pay him $10,000 if he agreed to help kill Paspalakis. However, James failed in his two attempts to kill Paspalakis: the first attempt was on October 31, 1989, when James wanted to stab and kill her while she was attending a Halloween party in a local nightclub, but he chickened out due to the large crowd. As for the second attempt, James planned to shoot and kill Paspalakis once she was alone in her office, and disguise it as a robbery attempt, but on November 1, 1989, the plan fell through after Paspalakis managed to get away. James's girlfriend, 21-year-old Lori Henderson, was aware of her boyfriend's involvement in the plot but she never reported it to the authorities.

After this, Fotopoulos instructed Hunt to look for another hitman to carry out the deed. As a result, 18-year-old Bryan Chase was hired to replace James and carry out the planned killing. Chase first attempted to kill Paspalakis by ramming into her car and then shooting her in the head, but his car developed mechanical problems and it hindered him from completing the task. Later, Chase was instructed to break into the matrimonial house of Fotopoulos and Paspalakis to kill the latter. However, Chase would fail twice to break into the house due to the tough plastic windows, and he was also scared away by neighbours before his attempts would go through. Fotopoulos, who was reportedly enraged when he got wind of the failures, would provide Chase with a knife to cut through the window and a small flashlight.

On the morning of November 4, 1989, Chase attempted for the third time to break into the house, and he succeeded. He entered the couple's bedroom and while Paspalakis was still asleep, he fired one shot in her head. Afterwards, Fotopoulos wielded a gun to shoot Chase multiple times, killing him on the spot, so as to disguise it as a killing of an armed burglar in self-defense. However, Lisa recovered after being hospitalized and treated, although the .22 caliber bullet remained stuck inside her head.

Initially, Fotopoulos told the police that he killed Chase in self-defense for burglarizing their house and shooting his wife, but the police investigations would shed light on Fotopoulos's attempts to kill his wife. Fotopoulos was arrested on a charge of soliciting to commit murder, and was further charged with the murders of Chase and Ramsey, the latter whose body was found after Fotopoulos was arrested and linked to the killing.

== Trials of Fotopoulos ==
=== Federal counterfeiting charges ===
Apart from the state murder charges in Florida, in February 1990, Fotopoulos was indicted by a grand jury in federal court with a total of 11 counts of counterfeiting and witness tampering in an unrelated case.

On April 2, 1990, Fotopoulos pleaded guilty to masterminding the counterfeiting case.

On June 20, 1990, Fotopoulos was sentenced to 33 months in federal prison and a $10,000 fine.

=== State murder charges and trial ===
In December 1989, a Volusia County grand jury formally indicted Fotopoulos in state court with two counts of first-degree murder. The trial venue of Fotopoulos was shifted from Volusia County to Putnam County in July 1990, and it first took place in October 1990.

On October 25, 1990, Fotopoulos was found guilty of a total of eight criminal charges: two counts of first-degree murder for the deaths of Chase and Ramsey, two counts of attempted murder, one count of burglary, one count of conspiracy and two counts of solicitation the murder attempts on his wife. Fotopoulos slashed his wrists and lower legs hours after he was convicted of the murders, and he was taken to the hospital. Reports showed that Fotopoulos did not do it as part of a suicide attempt but rather as a possible tactic to escape from prison.

On October 29, 1990, by a majority vote of 8–4, the jury decided that Fotopoulos should be sentenced to death for the double murder charges.

On November 1, 1990, Circuit Judge S. James Foxman sentenced Fotopoulos to death by the electrocution for the murders of Ramsay and Chase.

=== Fates of Hunt and other accomplices ===
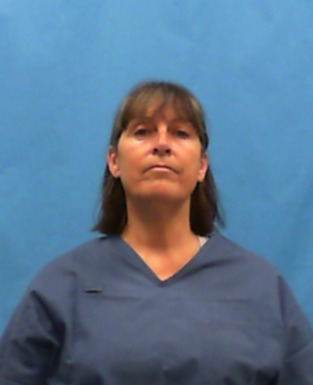
Deidre Hunt

After the arrest of Fotopoulos, the police also arrested Deidre Hunt, Teja James and Lori Henderson for their part in the plot to kill Fotopoulos's wife. Hunt was charged with soliciting to commit murder and one count of first-degree murder; James was charged with attempted robbery and attempted first-degree murder; and Henderson was charged with conspiracy to commit first-degree murder.

Lori Henderson and Teja James, who were both charged for their minor involvement in the murder schemes, were each sentenced to four years in prison for conspiring to commit first-degree murder and attempted first-degree murder, after they secured plea deals in exchange for their testimonies against Hunt and Fotopoulos.

On September 14, 1990, Hunt, who pleaded guilty to the murders, was sentenced to death by Circuit Judge S. James Foxman. Hunt was one of 16 women to receive the death penalty in the history of Florida as of 2026.

However, two years after she was sent to death row, Hunt's death sentences were overturned by the Florida Supreme Court upon her appeal. In 1995, Hunt appealed to withdraw her guilty plea, after it came to light that her trial attorney negotiated a monetary deal with a TV station in securing an interview of Hunt in prison for the station's employees. Hunt was granted a re-trial, and in April 1998, she was found guilty again of the two murders.

On May 7, 1998, Hunt was sentenced to eight life sentences, consisting of two consecutive life terms without parole for 50 years for the murders of Chase and Ramsay, and another six life terms for armed burglary, attempted murder and conspiracy.

== Appeal process ==
On October 15, 1992, the Florida Supreme Court denied the appeal of Fotopoulos against his death sentences. During the same court hearing, the court simultaneously allowed the appeal of Deidre Hunt and overturned her death sentences, which eventually led to her re-trial and re-sentencing in 1998 to life in prison.

On December 20, 2002, Fotopoulos lost another appeal to the Florida Supreme Court.

On January 31, 2007, U.S. District Judge Gregory A. Presnell granted Fotopoulos a new sentencing hearing, after he accepted two of Fotopoulos's claims that his death sentence was unfairly imposed, given that the prosecution presented two different portrayals of Hunt in their respective trials for the murder scheme.

On February 14, 2008, Judge Presnell's ruling was overturned by the 11th U.S. Circuit Court of Appeals, and Fotopoulos's death sentences were upheld.

On January 29, 2018, the Florida Supreme Court denied Fotopoulos's re-sentencing plea, affirming that in spite of the split majority vote of 8–4, his two death sentences was imposed and finalized in 1993, nine years prior to 2002 and he was therefore ineligible for re-sentencing under a new law. This particular law dictated that an individual could only be sentenced to death by unanimous jury votes, although it did not retroactively apply to cases decided before June 24, 2002.

== Death row ==
As of August 2019, Fotopoulos was one of 16 inmates from Volusia and Flagler Counties who were awaiting execution on Florida's death row.

A February 2023 report revealed that Fotopoulos was one of 11 Volusia County inmates on Florida's death row. As of 2026, Fotopoulos is incarcerated on death row at the Union Correctional Institution.

== Aftermath ==
After she survived the shooting, Lisa Paspalakis, who divorced Fotopoulos, pursued business interests and also started a new relationship. In a 1991 article, she stated that it was difficult to realize that her husband turned out to be a terrible person, but she found it fortunate to have the support of her numerous family members and friends throughout the ordeal. Paspalakis remarried, and established her career as a businesswoman, and formed a close relationship with her two nephews.

== In popular culture ==
American writer Gary Provost wrote a book titled Perfect Husband, which detailed Konstantinos Fotopoulos's six murder attempts to kill his wife. Paspalakis provided details of her relationship with Fotopoulos to Provost in the writing process, and she spoke about her experiences in a national talk show where the topic of women being targeted for murder by their husbands was discussed.

Uncensored footage of the videotaped killing of Kevin Ramsay by Deidre Hunt was shown in the 1998 shockumentary film, Banned from Television.

In July 2014, Snapped: Killer Couples, a true crime show which aired on Oxygen, re-enacted the case of Fotopoulos and Hunt.

== See also ==
- Capital punishment in Florida
- List of death row inmates in the United States § Florida
