= Natural Born Killers copycat crimes =

Criminal acts allegedly inspired by the movie Natural Born Killers

Since the 1994 film Natural Born Killers was released, several attacks suspected to be copycat crimes have been committed by fans of the film, mostly by high school students within the age range of 15 to 18. Though apparent links have been claimed between the film and most of the incidents described below, certain causality has not been proven.

== Major incidents ==
=== Shooting of William Savage and Patsy Byers ===
On 5 March 1995, Sarah Edmondson and her boyfriend Benjamin James Darras (both 18) spent a night alone together at her family's cabin in Muskogee, Oklahoma, watching Natural Born Killers. Two days later, they left the cabin and packed Edmondson's Nissan Maxima with blankets and a .38-caliber revolver. They allegedly left Muskogee to attend a Grateful Dead concert in Memphis, Tennessee. On 7 March, they arrived in Hernando, Mississippi, where Darras killed cotton-mill manager William Savage by shooting him twice in the head at point blank range. Darras then took a piece of blood-stained fabric from Savage to keep as a token. Later, with Edmondson, he spoke openly about killing Savage. They then travelled to Ponchatoula, Louisiana, where Edmondson shot Patsy Byers, a convenience store cashier. Byers survived the attack, being rendered quadriplegic. Savage had been a friend of best-selling author John Grisham, who publicly accused Oliver Stone of being irresponsible in making the film, stating that filmmakers should be held accountable for their work when it incites viewers to commit violent acts.

In July 1995, Byers took legal actions against Edmondson and Darras, and in March 1996 she amended her lawsuit to include Stone and the Time Warner company. With the advice of Grisham, Byers used a "product liability" claim, stating that the filmmakers "knew, or should have known that the film would cause and inspire people [...] to commit crimes such as the shooting of Patsy Ann Byers." Grisham wrote in an article called "Unnatural Killers" in the April 1996 edition of the Oxford American magazine, "The last hope of imposing some sense on Hollywood will come through another great American tradition, the lawsuit. A case can be made that there exists a direct causal link between Natural Born Killers and the death of Bill Savage. It will take only one large verdict against the likes of Oliver Stone, and then the party will be over." On 23 January 1997, on the grounds that filmmakers and production companies are protected by the First Amendment, the case was dismissed, but Byers immediately appealed, and on 15 May 1998, the Intermediate Louisiana Court of Appeals overturned that decision, claiming that Byers did indeed have a valid case against the filmmakers (Byers had died of cancer in late 1997). On 12 March 2001, Judge Robert Morrison dismissed the case on the grounds that there was no evidence that either Time Warner or Stone had intended to incite violence.

In June 2002, the Louisiana Court of Appeal turned down an appeal from Byers' attorneys, and the suit was closed.

Sarah Edmondson was released on parole in Oklahoma after serving less than twelve years of a thirty-year sentence. Her parole ended in 2025.

Benjamin Darras continues to serve his sentence at the Mississippi State Penitentiary at Parchman. He has written a letter for pardoning to the Mississippi Governor's Office where he explains how his life has changed in prison. He also has a bachelor's degree in Christian Ministry from the New Orleans Baptist Theological Seminary and tutors for their Parchman extension.

The case was featured in an episode of the Oxygen Network true crime series Snapped: Killer Couples which originally aired on 24 March 2013.

This case was featured in an episode of Reelz series CopyCat Killers that originally aired 5 March 2016.

=== Frontier Middle School shooting ===
On 2 February 1996, in Moses Lake, Washington, 14-year-old Barry Loukaitis entered his algebra classroom dressed as a Wild West-style gunslinger and was wearing a black duster. He was armed with a .30-30 caliber hunting rifle and two handguns (.22 caliber revolver and .25-caliber semiautomatic pistol) that belonged to his father and was carrying approximately 78 rounds of ammunition. He opened fire at students, killing two, Arnold Fritz and Manuel Vela, Jr., both fourteen. Another student, 13-year-old Natalie Hintz, sustained critical gunshot wounds to the right arm and abdomen, and was airlifted to Harborview Medical Center in Seattle. Loukaitis then fatally shot his algebra teacher Leona Caires in the chest. Teacher and coach Jon Lane entered the classroom upon hearing the gunshots to find Loukaitis holding his classmates hostage. He planned to use one hostage so he could safely exit the school. Lane volunteered as the hostage, and Loukaitis kept him at gunpoint with his rifle. Lane then grabbed the weapon from Loukaitis and wrestled him to the ground, later assisting in the evacuation of students. He kept Loukaitis subdued until police arrived at the scene.

Loukaitis was said to be obsessed with violent books and movies, including Natural Born Killers. He rented the movie seven times and would often quote it to friends.

=== Heath High School shooting ===
On 1 December 1997 in West Paducah, Kentucky, 14-year-old Michael Carneal went to school carrying four .22 rifles, two .30-30 Winchester rifles and a Ruger .22 handgun. Upon arriving at the school, he inserted a pair of earplugs and opened fire with the handgun at a prayer meeting, killing three of his classmates and wounding five others. After he was finished shooting, Carneal calmly dropped the gun and surrendered to the school principal. Carneal was charged with murder and attempted murder and initially sentenced to three life sentences for murder plus 150 years for five counts of attempted murder. Following appeal, this was altered to life in prison with no possibility of parole. In April 1999, Jack Thompson, attorney for the parents of the murdered children, filed a $33 million lawsuit against Time Warner, Polygram Film, Palm Pictures, Island Pictures, New Line Cinema, Atari, Nintendo, and Sony Computer Entertainment. Specifically mentioned were Natural Born Killers and the 1995 film The Basketball Diaries, as well as the video games Doom, Redneck Rampage, Nightmare Creatures, Resident Evil, and Mortal Kombat. Thompson argued that the films and games had encouraged Carneal to act the way he did, and that Doom had provided him with excellent target practice. In July 2001, the US Court of Appeals affirmed the lower court's dismissal of the case.

=== Columbine High School massacre ===
On 20 April 1999, students Eric Harris and Dylan Klebold murdered twelve students and one teacher at Columbine High School in Columbine, Colorado. The massacre ended with both perpetrators committing suicide. Both Harris and Klebold were fans of Natural Born Killers. Prior to the massacre, they had used the initials 'NBK' as their code. In a journal entry dated 10 April 1998, Harris wrote: "When I go NBK and people say things like 'Oh, it was so tragic,' or 'oh he is crazy!' or 'It was so bloody', just because your mommy and daddy told you blood and violence is bad, you think it's a fucking law of nature? Wrong, only science and math are true, everything, and I mean every fucking thing else is Man made. Before I leave this worthless place, I will kill whoever I deem unfit for anything at all, especially life." Harris also referred to 20 April as "the holy April morning of NBK", and in an undated journal entry, Klebold wrote "I'm stuck in humanity. Maybe going NBK w. Eric is the way to break free".

=== Richardson family murders ===
On 23 April 2006, Jeremy Allan Steinke (23) and his girlfriend Jasmine Richardson (12) murdered her parents, Marc and Debra Richardson, as well as her 8-year-old brother, Jacob, in Medicine Hat, Alberta. Steinke and Richardson were arrested on 24 April in Leader, Saskatchewan, and were charged with three counts of first-degree murder. According to Richardson's friends, her parents had punished her for dating Steinke due to the age disparity and forbade her from visiting him. Shortly after her arrest, Steinke proposed marriage to Richardson, which she accepted.

On 9 July 2007, Richardson was found guilty of three counts of first-degree murder and was sentenced to ten years in prison, which is the maximum penalty for an individual under 14 years of age. On 5 December 2008, Steinke was also found guilty of three counts of first-degree murder and on 15 December he was sentenced to life in prison without the possibility for parole for 25 years. The Natural Born Killers connection was that Steinke had allegedly watched the film the night before the incident. He also spoke to friends of "going Natural Born Killers on her [Richardson] family".

=== 2006 Dawson College shooting ===
On 13 September 2006, at Dawson College, a CEGEP in Westmount near downtown Montreal, Quebec, Canada, Kimveer Gill began shooting outside the de Maisonneuve Boulevard entrance to the school, and moved towards the atrium by the cafeteria on the main floor. One victim died at the scene, while another 19 were injured, eight of whom were listed in critical condition with six requiring surgery. The shooter later committed suicide by shooting himself in the head after being shot in the arm by police. He listed the movie as one of his favorites on his blog.

== Other incidents ==
=== 1990s ===
- In Paris, France, two lovers, Florence Rey and Audry Maupin, killed five people on 4 October 1994. The pair embarked on a high speed chase that ended with a police shootout that killed a taxi driver, three police officers, and Maupin. The two's rampage, hostage taking, high speed chase, and shootouts were connected to the film. Rey was convicted as complicit in the murders, stating she fired 12 shots but none resulted in any deaths.
- In October 1994, 17-year-old Nathan Martinez from Bluffdale, Utah, shot and killed his stepmother and 10-year-old half-sister while they slept. He was apprehended three days later in O'Neill, Nebraska following a nationwide manhunt. Martinez was allegedly obsessed with the film and claims to have seen it at least 10 times in the week prior to the murders. He had even shaved his head the way Mickey does at the end of the movie, and he had taken to wearing the same style of round sunglasses as Mickey. Martinez was released on parole in May 2018.
- On 5 March 1995, in Senoia, Georgia, 15-year-old Jason Lewis shot and killed his parents after allegedly deciding he wanted to emulate Mickey and Mallory. Lewis was on the telephone talking to a friend discussing how he was planning to kill his mother and father and leave for the road, when he suddenly announced, "I'm going to do it." According to the friend, as he listened on the phone, he heard Lewis shooting his parents. He grabbed his father's 12-gauge shotgun and shot his mother, sitting in a recliner watching television. The shot didn't kill her and as she screamed, he fired again, hitting his father who was lying on a nearby couch. A third shot to his mother's face killed her and a fourth shot to his father's forehead killed him. According to Lewis' friend, Lewis then calmly returned to the phone and announced "I did it. It's done." It was subsequently discovered that Lewis was one of four young boys who planned to kill their parents, and embark on a cross country killing spree similar to that seen in the film. All four boys were arrested. During interrogation, when asked why he did it, Lewis told investigators that it was because his parents had imposed a midnight curfew on him.
- In Avon, Massachusetts, in June 1995, two men, ages 18 and 20, killed a physically handicapped 65-year-old man by stabbing him 27 times with a Bowie knife whilst he lay sleeping in his bed. The attack was so ferocious that both of the man's wrists were broken due to the force of the attacks, and his body was split open from clavicle to spine. After the murder, the ringleader bragged to his girlfriend about the murder. When she expressed horror at his actions, he asked her "Haven't you ever seen Natural Born Killers before?" During the interrogation, one of the murderers told police, "[w]e know what we did was bad, but we didn't know this guy so we weren't going to cry about it."
- On 3 January 1997, New York firefighter James Halversen was running at the high school track in Centereach, New York, when William Sodders (21) shot and killed him in an act of random violence. Sodders had purchased a 9 mm pistol, and he and his friend Eric Calvin had gone to the track to practice shooting. When they got there, Sodders encountered Halversen. He went out onto the track, and bent over pretending to tie his shoelaces. As Halversen approached, Sodders stood up and shot him at point-blank range. He also shot and killed Halversen's dog. The next day, Sodders's father, Patrick, turned him in to police after Sodders's girlfriend, Nicole, told Patrick that she thought William had something to do with the killing. According to Patrick Sodders, Natural Born Killers was his son's favorite film, and he deeply admired Mickey and Mallory. According to his father, ever since seeing the film, Sodders had even begun to act like Mickey. Sodders was sentenced to 25-years-to-life in prison.

=== 2000s ===
- On 14 April 2001, Luther Casteel was kicked out of JB's Pub in Elgin, Illinois, for harassing female customers and employees. Drunk and enraged, he went straight home, shaved his hair into a mohawk and changed into military fatigues, armed himself with two handguns (Smith & Wesson .357 Magnum revolver and Smith & Wesson 9mm semi-automatic pistol), two shotguns (12-gauge sawed-off shotgun and Harrington & Richardson 12-gauge pump-action shotgun), and 200 rounds of live ammunition. Once he started shooting, witnesses said he laughed and screamed, "I'm the king, how do you like me now?" Also screaming "I am a natural born killer" and "I am the king", he fatally shot bartender Jeffrey Weides and customer Richard Bartlett and wounded 16 others (some of whom were permanently disabled) before being wrestled to the ground by bar patrons and employees. At his trial, facing the death penalty, Casteel said "I'm not someone who asks for mercy or pity for my actions" and "I have absolutely no fear of anything anyone can put upon me." He was sentenced to death. Casteel's sentence was commuted to life without parole in 2003 after then-governor George Ryan commuted the sentences of all death row inmates.
- On 18 December 2004, in Jacksonville, Florida, Angus Wallen and Kara Winn (both 27) shot and killed their roommate Brandon Murphy (22) before setting him and the apartment on fire in an attempt to cover up the crime. Wallen and Winn had only recently moved in with Murphy, and had decided to steal his car, debit card, and Nintendo games. When he resisted, Winn shot him in his shoulder and Wallen shot him in the head, killing him. They had allegedly watched Natural Born Killers the night before the murder, and prosecutors argued that the crime resembled a similar crime in the film where a couple kill a man, light his remains on fire, and then escape together, even though there wasn't such a scene in the film. They were arrested the next day in Biloxi, Mississippi, and during the subsequent trial, they turned on one another, each saying the murder was the other's idea. They were both sentenced to life in prison without the possibility of parole.
- On 19 July 2008, in Milwaukee, Wisconsin, Eric Tavulares strangled his girlfriend, Lauren Aljubouri, to death. Tavulares and Aljubouri, both 18, had been watching the movie, and stopped it about halfway through before going to bed. According to Tavulares, he and Aljubouri were lying in bed talking, when he "switched mentally" and began strangling her. Upon arriving at the scene, Tavulares told police "I did it, I can't believe it. I did it." He later claimed that he had seen Natural Born Killers between 10 and 20 times. On 31 January 2009, Tavulares (who pleaded guilty during the trial) was sentenced to a minimum of 40 years in prison.

== See also ==
- Scream copycat crimes
