= Jupiter Entertainment =

American television production company

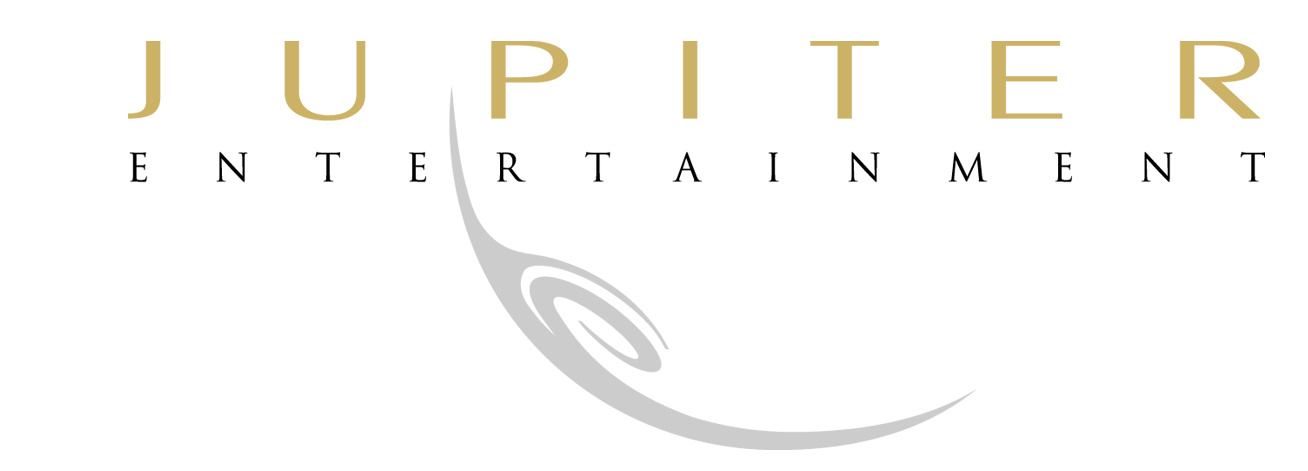
- Company type: Subsidiary
- Industry: Television production
- Founded: 1996; 30 years ago
- Founder: Connor Teasdale
- Headquarters: Knoxville; New York City; Los Angeles
- Area served: United States
- Key people: Patrick Reardon (president)
- Parent: Sky Studios (60%)
- Website: jupiterent.com

Jupiter Entertainment (also known as Jupiter) is an American television production company founded by Stephen Land in 1996.

The company has offices in New York, Los Angeles, and Knoxville, Tennessee.

In March 2015, Sky plc acquired 60% of Jupiter.

== Current television shows ==
- American Detective with Lt. Joe Kenda
- In Pursuit with John Walsh
- Vengeance: Killer Lovers
- Vengeance: Killer Neighbors
- Vengeance: Killer Coworkers
- Vengeance: Killer Millionaires
- Vengeance: Killer Families
- Vengeance: Killer Newlyweds
- Fatal Attraction
- Snapped
- Snapped: Killer Couples
- Storm of Suspicion

== Past television shows ==
- Sons of Guns
- Sins and Secrets
- Modern Marvels
- City Confidential
- Biography
- The Diamond Story
- Three Precious Gems: Rubies, Emeralds, Sapphires
- Human Weapon
- HowStuffWorks
- America's Castles
- RollerJam
- Club Dance
- Ten Exotic and Phenomenal Gemstones
- Hey Dude
- Dominick Dunne's Power, Privilege, and Justice
- King of the Jungle
- The Grand Tour
- The Gemstone Journey
- Live Through This
- Homicide Hunter: Lt. Joe Kenda
- Welcome to Myrtle Manor
