= Murder of Sam Catron =

American politician (1953–2002)

Catron

Samuel Wilson Catron (May 11, 1953 – April 13, 2002) was sheriff of Pulaski County, Kentucky. On the evening of April 13, 2002, Catron was assassinated by Danny Shelley after he finished a campaign speech at a fish fry and political rally being held at the Shopville-Stab, Kentucky Volunteer Fire Department in the small community of Stab, Kentucky. Sheriff Catron was running for a fifth term as sheriff. His former deputy, Jeff Morris, who was campaigning against him, and Kenneth White, a well-known drug dealer, conspired to commit the murder. He is buried at Somerset Cemetery in Somerset, Kentucky, along with other relatives. A memorial for Sam Catron can be viewed by the public directly across from the fire department, where Catron fell beside his police cruiser.

== Biography ==
Catron's father, Harold Catron, was chief of police in Somerset. He died in 1964 due to complications from a shotgun wound. Catron graduated from Somerset High School in 1971. His career in law enforcement began in the mid-1970s as a Pulaski County sheriff's deputy. He quit in 1981 after Johnny Adams was elected sheriff. In 1982, Catron became the chief of police for Ferguson, Kentucky, leaving the position in 1985 after being elected sheriff of Pulaski County. He held the office the rest of his days. During his tenure, Catron served on the Kentucky Governor's Task Force for Marijuana Eradication, the Pulaski County Rescue Squad, the Appalachian High Density Drug Traffic Area task force, was a member of the National Sheriffs' Association and was named Sheriff of the Year in 1989. Sheriff Catron was well known as an enemy of drug traffickers, flying a helicopter to search for marijuana plants and filling courtrooms with offenders his department had nabbed. In his private life, Catron served on the board of his local Boy Scout troop, was a Vigil life member and past chief of the Kawida Lodge Order of the Arrow, Boy Scouts of America.

== Convictions ==
Danny Shelley was convicted of firing the shot that killed Catron. A convicted drug dealer Kenneth White and Catron's political opponent Jeff Morris, a former deputy, were also convicted. It is believed that White wanted Morris to become sheriff and that was the motive for the shooting.

Kenneth White was a prisoner of Kentucky State Reformatory until his death in November 2018. Shelley is serving a life sentence at Little Sandy Correctional Complex in Sandy Hook. He will be eligible for parole in 2027, after serving 25 years of his sentence.

== Assassination ==
Catron was leaving a political rally at a fish fry when Shelley fired the shot that killed him. Shelley was 30 years old at the time. Shelley attempted to escape on a motorcycle. He was arrested after crashing the motorcycle, and implicated Morris and White. Morris was a former deputy who was running against Catron. White supported him, seeing an opportunity to replace Catron with a corrupt Sheriff. Shelley, who fired the fatal shot, was an addict who was obtaining drugs from White. He later claimed to be intoxicated and impaired at the time of the shooting.

== Profiles ==
Catron's murder was profiled in an episode of the A&E Network's City Confidential, examining the town of Somerset, Kentucky, and was also explored in a third-season episode of Investigation Discovery's Sins and Secrets.

== Death of family members ==
In 2023, Catron's brother and sister in law were found dead in their home. The cause of death was carbon monoxide poisoning. It is believed to have been accidental due to a vehicle that was left running in the garage.

== Sources ==
- Obituary
- CNN Article
