= Maryland Correctional Institution for Women =

Prison in Jessup, MD, USA

- Interactive map of Maryland Correctional Institution for Women
- Location: Jessup, Maryland; 39.1349°N 76.7745°W
- Status: Operational
- Security class: Adult women
- Population: 800 (2014)
- Managed by: Maryland Department of Public Safety and Correctional Services
- Warden: Tikaya Parker

Maryland Correctional Institution for Women (MCI-W) is a multi-level security prison operated by the Maryland Department of Public Safety and Correctional Services in Jessup, Maryland.

== Prisoners ==
Diane Sawyer visited the prison in 2015 for a special ABC report on women behind bars. Women at the prison stitch flags for Maryland government agencies. Women helped write plays that were eventually performed outside of prison. Yoga classes have been taught at the prison.

== Education ==
Goucher College offers courses to inmates at MCI-W.

== Notable incidents ==
In 2013, a Department of Justice report found higher-than-average rates of guard-on-inmate sexual abuse.

== Inmates ==
=== Former ===
- Heather Cook
- Felicia "Snoopy" Pearson

=== Current ===
- Brittany Norwood
- Wendi Michelle Scott
- Erika Sifrit
