= Sins and Secrets =

Television series

- Genre: Documentary
- Narrated by: Bill Graves
- Country of origin: United States
- Original language: English
- No. of seasons: 4
- No. of episodes: 45

Production
- Executive producers: Stephen Land; Thomas Cutler
- Producer: Greg Francis
- Editor: Shane Day
- Running time: 40 to 44 minutes
- Production company: Jupiter Entertainment

Original release
- Network: Investigation Discovery
- Release: February 17, 2011 – June 17, 2013

Sins and Secrets (also styled Sins & Secrets) is an American television documentary series on Investigation Discovery that debuted February 17, 2011. Each program profiles a notorious crime by detailing the city or community where the crime took place, often focusing on details from the personal lives of individual investigators. The series ended in 2013, after its fourth season.

Sins and Secrets has been compared to the A&E series City Confidential.

== Episodes ==
=== Season 1 (2011) ===
No. overall	No. in season	Title	Original release date
1	1	"Knoxville"	February 17, 2011
The 2007 murders of Channon Christian and Christopher Newsom during a carjacking ignite racial tensions in Knoxville, Tennessee.
2	2	"New Orleans"	February 24, 2011
Vince Marinello was a sportscaster in New Orleans, Louisiana who got caught for the 2006 shooting death of his third wife, Mary Elizabeth.
3	3	"Nantucket"	March 3, 2011
Beth Lochtefeld is found murdered in 2004 in her Nantucket, Massachusetts home, and police tie the crime to her ex-boyfriend, Tom Toolan.
4	4	"Shreveport"	March 10, 2011
The 2001 disappearance of Vol "Bubba" Dooley, III, of Shreveport, the son of former Bossier Parish Sheriff Vol Dooley, is linked to his estranged wife Jocelyn. Former Sheriff Dooley, District Attorney Schuyler Marvin, and Marvin's cousin, Judge John Cecil Campbell, appear as themselves.
5	5	"Albuquerque"	March 17, 2011
While investigating the murder of Girly Chew Hossencofft in 1999, Albuquerque, New Mexico police make shocking discoveries.
6	6	"Aspen"	March 24, 2011
Kathy Denson was a prominent furrier in Aspen, Colorado who was accused of shooting her ex-boyfriend, Cody Boyd, to death in 2002.

=== Season 2 (2012) ===
No. overall	No. in season	Title	Original release date
7	1	"Lexington"	January 12, 2012
University of Kentucky football player Trent DiGiuro is gunned down at a party in Lexington, Kentucky in 1994 by his rival, Shane Ragland.
8	2	"Anchorage"	January 19, 2012
An unexpected confession nine years after the 1996 murder of Kent Leppink in Anchorage, Alaska points to the dead man's then-fiancee.
9	3	"Fayetteville"	January 26, 2012
United States Air Force captain Marty Theer is gunned down by his wife's lover outside of his wife's Fayetteville, North Carolina office in 2000.
10	4	"Tampa"	February 2, 2012
When Tampa, Florida bartender Sandra Rozzo is murdered in her garage in 2003, police suspect her ex-boyfriend, but he points to his wife.
11	5	"Cleveland"	February 9, 2012
Cleveland, Ohio doctor Yazeed Essa poisons his wife Rose Marie with cyanide in 2005 and then tries to pass her death off as a car crash.
12	6	"Key West"	February 16, 2012
A botanist in Key West, Florida is found murdered in his home in 2006, and police uncover evidence of an alternative lifestyle in their investigation.
13	7	"Newry"	February 23, 2012
Julie Bullard's Newry, Maine bed and breakfast becomes the target of Christian Charles Nielsen when the bodies of four people are found behind the inn in 2006.
14	8	"Ocean City"	March 1, 2012
A Memorial Day vacation in Ocean City, Maryland turns deadly for Geney Crutchley and Josh Ford when they meet Erika and Benjamin Sifrit in 2002.
15	9	"Chicago"	March 8, 2012
Chicago, Illinois resident Becky Klein suddenly disappears in 2007, and police investigate the woman's lesbian lover, Nicole Abusharif.
16	10	"Rome"	March 15, 2012
A church deacon in Rome, Georgia is stabbed to death at his workplace in 2004, and the community is shocked to learn the motive behind the murder.
17	11	"Missoula"	March 22, 2012
When a Missoula, Montana husband is shot dead in 2007, his wife claims that his mistress had been stalking their family, but police uncover the truth.
18	12	"Mio"	March 29, 2012
Two decades after the disappearances of two hunters from Mio, Michigan in 1985, an informant comes forward to police and identifies the killers.
19	13	"Charleston"	April 5, 2012
Charleston, South Carolina resident Kate Waring goes missing in 2009, and when her remains are found, the town is stunned by her killers' identities.

=== Season 3 (2012) ===
No. overall	No. in season	Title	Original release date
20	1	"Palm Beach"	April 12, 2012
Dalia Dippolito was a Palm Beach, Florida woman who, after failing to get her husband's probation revoked, attempted to hire a hit man in 2009.
21	2	"Somerset"	April 19, 2012
Sam Catron was a sheriff from Somerset, Kentucky who was murdered in 2002 as a result of a plot by two drug dealers and a former deputy.
22	3	"Farmington Hills"	April 26, 2012
Nancy Seaman was an elementary schoolteacher from Farmington Hills, Michigan who attacked her husband with a hatchet in 2004.
23	4	"Auburn"	August 26, 2012
The community and university of Auburn, Alabama is stunned and horrified when Lauren Burk, a college freshman, is found murdered in 2009.
24	5	"Kansas City"	September 2, 2012
John Edward Robinson was a serial killer who murdered several women on his property in Kansas City, Missouri until he was apprehended in 2000.
25	6	"Charlotte"	September 9, 2012
Rae Carruth was a wide receiver for the Carolina Panthers when he was charged with killing his pregnant girlfriend in Charlotte, North Carolina in 1999.
26	7	"Fresno"	September 16, 2012
Larissa Schuster was a Fresno, California biochemist who killed her estranged husband, Tim, in 2003 by dissolving his body in hydrochloric acid.
27	8	"Nashville"	September 23, 2012
Jim Cannon was a successful attorney living in Nashville, Tennessee until he was found strangled to death in 2008, and his estranged wife is suspected.
28	9	"Catalina Island"	September 30, 2012
After Stephen Williams's body is discovered off the coast of Catalina Island, California in 2006, police tie his savage murder to a greedy stockbroker.
29	10	"Hilo"	October 14, 2012
The peaceful town of Hilo, Hawaii is shocked when 23-year-old Dana Ireland is brutally kidnapped, sexually assaulted, and murdered on Christmas Eve 1991.
30	11	"Iaeger"	October 21, 2012
A local physician and politician, Doc Whitley, ends up the victim of a robbery and a deadly arson fire in the small town of Iaeger, West Virginia in 2005.
31	12	"Plattsburgh"	October 28, 2012
When furniture store owners are found stabbed to death in Plattsburgh, New York in 2005, police wonder who had a motive to kill the couple.
32	13	"Boone"	November 4, 2012
When an Appalachian State University grad student vanishes in 1989, police in Boone, North Carolina have few leads until another co-ed disappears.
33	14	"Omaha"	November 11, 2012
A twisted love triangle and murder conspiracy are revealed after an Omaha, Nebraska father is murdered in 2009 after what initially appears to be a burglary.
34	15	"Palo Alto"	November 18, 2012
A Palo Alto, California real estate broker's roller-coaster relationship with her boyfriend, a hookah lounge owner, goes up in flames in 2009.
35	16	"Carthage"	November 25, 2012
A wealthy Carthage, Texas widow goes missing in 1997, and when her body is discovered, police investigate Bernie Tiede, who was stealing from her.

=== Season 4 (2013) ===
No. overall	No. in season	Title	Original release date
36	1	"Bloodshed on the Bayou"	April 15, 2013
Murder of Ronald Shaw in Lafayette, Louisiana
37	2	"Happy Valentine's Slay"	April 22, 2013
Murder of Stephen Hricko in Saint Michaels, Maryland
38	3	"Sweet Talker, Midnight Stalker"	April 29, 2013
Murder of Dana Clair Edwards in San Antonio
39	4	"Bible Belt Bloodshed"	May 6, 2013
Murder of Grady Nichols in Decatur, Tennessee
40	5	"Bleed All About It"	May 13, 2013
Murder of Chauncey Bailey
41	6	"With this Ring, I Thee Kill"	May 20, 2013
Murder of Michael Cobb in Pryor, Oklahoma
42	7	"The Murder Inn"	May 27, 2013
Michelle Knotek
43	8	"To Have and to Kill"	June 3, 2013
Murders of Michael Sisco and Karen Harkness in Topeka, Kansas
44	9	"Dressed to Kill"	June 10, 2013
Murder of Angie Zapata
45	10	"Murder, Lies & Bondage Ties"	June 17, 2013
Murder of May Greineder in Wellesley, Massachusetts
