= Jeffrey Dampier =

American lottery winner (1966–2005)

Jeffrey Dampier Jr. (March 24, 1966 – July 26, 2005) was the winner of a 1996 Illinois Lottery jackpot of US$20 million (equivalent to $36.8 million in 2024). He was murdered by his sister-in-law and her boyfriend in 2005.

== Early life ==
Dampier was born in Chicago's West Side. His father was Jeffrey Dampier Sr. His widow was Crystal Jackson Dampier.

== Winning the jackpot ==
Dampier and his ex-wife won the Illinois Lottery jackpot in 1996. It was worth approximately US $20 million. They eventually divorced and split the money 50/50. Soon after, Jeffrey met Crystal Jackson, dated and married her. Two years later, the two moved to Tampa Bay.

Once in Florida, Dampier used the money to invest in a popcorn business called Kassie's Gourmet Popcorn, based in Tampa Bay's Channelside entertainment district. Shortly after, he moved Crystal's two sisters, Victoria and Terri Jackson, to Tampa as well. With no means of their own, Dampier took care of both of the sisters' finances and continued to buy presents for many of their family members, including his sister-in-law Victoria Jackson (with whom he was having an affair).

== Murder ==
On July 26, 2005, Dampier was murdered by Victoria Jackson and her boyfriend Nathaniel Jackson, presumably for his jackpot winnings.

There are multiple accounts of the murder. According to some sources, Dampier was lured to the Jacksons' apartment by Victoria Jackson, who claimed that she had car problems. Dampier's hands and feet were bound with shoelaces. Nathaniel Jackson then pointed a gun at Dampier and forced him into his van. Terri Jackson, Victoria's sister, was also at the scene of the murder. Afterwards, Nathaniel gave the shotgun to Victoria and reportedly said, "Shoot him or I'll shoot you." Dampier was shot in the back of the head.

== Trial and reaction ==
Victoria Jackson was tried and found guilty of first-degree murder, armed kidnapping and armed carjacking in 2006. She was sentenced to three consecutive life sentences. Nathaniel Jackson was prosecuted similarly.

Jeffrey Dampier Sr. said that "I think everything was correct. I think the state did a good job. I'm very happy. I think my family is happy."

== Media ==
Jeffrey Dampier’s homicide has been featured on the Investigation Discovery series Blood Relatives, the Oxygen series Snapped: Killer Couples, and the TV One series Fatal Attraction.
