= Starbucks murders =

1997 murders in Washington, D.C.

- Date: July 6, 1997
- Location: Georgetown, Washington, D.C.
- Cause: Execution-style murder
- Participants: Carl Derek Cooper
- Deaths: Mary Caitrin Mahoney; Emory Allen Evans; Aaron David Goodrich

The Starbucks murders occurred on July 6, 1997, at a Starbucks store in Georgetown, Washington, D.C., where three employees were killed. The murder weapons were a .38-caliber snub-nosed revolver and a .380-caliber semi-automatic pistol.

== Murder ==
On the morning of Tuesday, July 8, Starbucks regional director Dean Torrenga toured the crime scene with police. He said, "nothing [like this] in the history of the company... has ever happened..."

== Conviction ==
On the evening of Monday, March 1, 1999, Carl Derek Cooper was arrested and brought in for questioning about a 1996 attempted murder of an off-duty Prince George's County police officer.

Cooper was charged with three counts of first-degree murder on March 5, 1999. On March 5, Keith Covington, was questioned by Metropolitan Police Department of the District of Columbia and the FBI for 15 hours. Covington acknowledged that he knew Evans, one of the 25-year-old victims, and that he grew up near Cooper but that was all. To avoid the death penalty, Cooper also admitted to the 1993 murder of a security guard, an attempted murder in 1996 and a series of robberies throughout D.C., Maryland, and Pennsylvania. In total, he pled guilty to 47 criminal counts as part of the plea bargain, in which prosecutors agreed at Cooper's behest not to charge his mother or his wife with related lesser crimes.

Kenneth L. Wainstein, at the time an assistant U.S. attorney, described Cooper in court as the head of a thriving criminal business primed to use violence at the slightest sign of resistance. Wainstein said Cooper told associates, "If anyone bucks, bustle"—meaning, if there isn't instant cooperation, shoot. On April 25, 2000, Cooper was sentenced to life in prison without possibility of parole.

== Anniversary ==
On July 6, 2022, the 25th anniversary of the murders, Starbucks held a ceremony at the store to remember the three employees.

== In media ==
The FBI Files based the 13th episode of its fourth season on the murder, entitled The Coffee Shop Murders. The episode aired January 31, 2002. The Starbucks chain's identity is not mentioned, to avoid legal complications.

== See also ==
- Lululemon murder
- Clinton body count conspiracy theory — Mary Mahoney was a former White House intern whose death has appeared on various lists regarding the conspiracy theory.
