= Craig Titus =

American murderer (born 1965)

Craig Michael Titus (born January 14, 1965) is an American convicted murderer. He pleaded guilty to second-degree murder, first-degree kidnapping and arson in the death of 28-year-old Melissa James on December 14, 2005 in Las Vegas, Nevada; Melissa had been a personal assistant to him and his wife, Kelly Ryan. He was sentenced to 21 to 55 years in prison in 2008.

He was a former professional bodybuilder.

== Early life ==
Titus was born in 1965 in Wyandotte, Michigan, and lived most of his early life in Riverview, near Detroit. He is of Greek descent. He has a younger brother, Kevin, and a younger sister, Nicole. Titus went to public schools. He played high school football but quit because he felt he was too small, at 5'6". He also wrestled in high school.

== Career ==
When Titus graduated from high school, he was 5'6" and 140 lbs. By the age of 21, he was 5'8" and 185 lbs. He began to see good results from weight training and decided to become a bodybuilder.

His first bodybuilding competition was the 1988 Houston Bodybuilding Championships. He won the Men's Open middleweight class and the overall title. Over the next several years of placing among top finishers in competitions, he established himself by 1996 and was accepted into the professional ranks of the International Fitness and Bodybuilding Federation. He continued to compete into the 2000s, often placing among the top ten in his class. (See list below.)

== Early legal troubles ==
Titus had difficulties with controlled substances. In April 1995 in Louisiana, Titus pleaded guilty to conspiracy to possess with intent to distribute ecstasy. He was sentenced to 16 months' house arrest via monitoring with an electronic anklet. In July 1997, Titus was sentenced to 21 months in prison for violating his probation by using anabolic steroids.

== Murder of Melissa James ==
On December 14, 2005, the charred, gagged and bound body of 28-year-old Melissa James was found in the trunk of a burning Jaguar in the Nevada desert. A trucker had reported the car to authorities, who put out the fire before all evidence was destroyed.

After tracing the car to Kelly Ryan, the police interviewed both her and her husband Titus. Melissa James was their live-in personal assistant. The police released the couple, pending more investigation. They fled across the country to Massachusetts. Titus had admitted to detectives of having had an affair with James, but said he and his wife had ended their working relationship with her, claiming she had embezzled from them.

After a nine-day investigation and manhunt, police apprehended the couple and their alleged accomplice, Anthony Gross, near Boston. They were promptly extradited to Las Vegas, Nevada and arrested on charges of murder of James, kidnapping, and arson.

In February 2006, Titus and Ryan were denied bail. On March 29, each pleaded not guilty to a felony charge of killing Melissa James. The charge carried the possibility of the death penalty.

Days before their murder trial was set to begin in Las Vegas in June 2008, Titus and Ryan each pleaded guilty on May 30, 2008 to various charges related to James's death. They had made plea deals with the prosecutor to avoid capital charges that risked the death penalty. Titus pled guilty to second-degree murder, first-degree kidnapping, and arson.

On August 22, 2008, Titus was recorded as convicted of second-degree murder, kidnapping, and arson. He was sentenced to 21 to 55 years in prison. He is incarcerated at Lovelock Correctional Center, a state prison in Nevada.

Ryan had pleaded guilty to arson and battery with a deadly weapon with significant bodily harm. She was sentenced to two consecutive terms of 3–13 years in prison. She was released on parole in 2017.

== Personal life ==
In 2000, he married Kelly Ryan, a fitness competitor, in Clark County, Nevada. They had gotten to know each other through competitions. For a time, they had lived in Southern California. Ryan filed for divorce from Titus in 2009 while incarcerated.

== Competitions and titles ==
- 2005 IFBB Iron Man Pro—6th
- 2004 IFBB GNC Show Of Strength—6th
- 2004 IFBB Florida Xtreme Pro Challenge—7th
- 2004 IFBB Grand Prix Australia—6th
- 2004 IFBB Arnold Classic And Internationals—6th
- 2004 IFBB Iron Man Pro—5th
- 2003 IFBB Night Of Champions—3rd
- 2002 IFBB GNC Show Of Strength—7th
- 2002 Mr. Olympia—11th
- 2002 Night of Champions XIV—5th
- 2002 Southwest Pro—7th
- 2001 British Grand Prix—9th
- 2001 Mr. Olympia—12th
- 2001 Arnold Classic—6th
- 2001 San Francisco Grand Prix—2nd
- 2001 Ironman Pro Invitational—5th
- 2000 Toronto Pro—5th
- 2000 Arnold Classic—10th
- 2000 Night of Champions—11th
- 2000 Ironman Pro Invitational—8th
- 1996 NPC USA Championships—1st Heavyweight and Overall (earning pro card in the IFBB)
- 1995 NPC USA Championships—2nd Heavyweight
- 1994 NPC National Championships—2nd Heavyweight
- 1994 NPC USA Championships—2nd Heavyweight
- 1993 NPC USA Championships—4th Heavyweight
- 1991 NPC Ironman/Ironmaiden—Overall
- 1990 NPC Tournament of Champions—3rd Heavyweight
- 1990 NPC Western Cup—Overall
- 1989 NPC Houston Bodybuilding Championships—Overall
- 1988 NPC Houston Bodybuilding Championships—1st Middleweight and Overall

== See also ==
- List of male professional bodybuilders
- List of female professional bodybuilders
