= Kelly Ryan =

American criminal (born 1972)

- Professional bodybuilder

Personal info
- Nickname: "Flyin Ryan"
- Full name: Kelly Ann Ryan
- Born: July 10, 1972 (age 54); Minneapolis, Minnesota, U.S.

Best statistics
- Height: 5 ft 3 in (160 cm)
- Weight: (in season) 110–113 lb (50–51 kg) (off-season) 119–125 lb (54–57 kg)

Professional (Pro) career
- Pro-debut: NPC Team Universe Fitness Championships; 1998
- Best win: IFBB Fitness International Champion; 2000
- Predecessor: Susie Curry
- Successor: Jenny Worth
- Active: Retired 2005
- Criminal information
- Spouse: Craig Titus (2000–2009)
- Status: Previously incarcerated at Florence McClure Women's Correctional Center in North Las Vegas, Nevada Released on parole, 24 October 2017
- Convictions: Pled guilty to arson and entered a no-contest (Alford) plea to battery with a deadly weapon and assault
- Penalty: Two consecutive terms of 3–13 years each in state prison

Kelly Ann Ryan (born July 10, 1972, in Minneapolis, Minnesota) is an American known for being convicted of arson, and assault and battery with a deadly weapon, as an accessory to the December 14, 2005 murder of Melissa James. The young woman had been working as a personal assistant to Ryan and her husband Craig Titus at their home in Las Vegas.

Each of the defendants took plea deals shortly before their joint trial was to start. Titus was convicted of second-degree murder, kidnapping and arson, and received a much longer prison sentence than did his wife.

Ryan was sentenced for her charges to two consecutive terms of 3–13 years each. She was paroled on the second sentence on 24 October 2017.

Ryan is a former professional fitness champion and member of the International Federation of BodyBuilders.

== Early life and education ==
In 2005, her official website biography said that she had grown up in Greenville, South Carolina. She was a journalism graduate of University of South Carolina, where she had also been a cheerleader.

== Career ==
After college, Ryan decided to build on her athleticism. Her first fitness competition was the NPC South Carolina State in 1995, where she placed first.

She eventually won eight fitness competitions, including 2000 IFBB Fitness International Champion. Ryan placed second 4 times in a row (2000-2004) in the Fitness Olympia.

== Marriage ==
She married professional bodybuilder Craig Titus. They lived in Las Vegas and each continued their IFBB competitions. They had first hired Melissa James as a live-in personal assistant to support their competitions and plans when they were living in Southern California. James had moved back East, but returned to work for them in the late summer or fall 2005.

=== Murder of Melissa James ===
On December 14, 2005 the body of Melissa James was found bound and gagged in the trunk of a burning car in the desert. Law enforcement was able to extinguish the fire early enough to recover some evidence. The red Jaguar was found to belong to Kelly Ryan.

Ryan had suspected that her husband had a secret affair with James. After James's body was found, the couple fled Las Vegas and traveled cross-country to Massachusetts, along with accomplice Anthony Gross. They were apprehended and arrested in Boston, from where they were extradited to Nevada.

While Ryan was awaiting trial, her mother died in April 2006 of a heart attack.

The Washoe County District Attorney decided to try Titus and Ryan together, but on differing charges. They originally entered pleas of not guilty. Co-defendant Anthony Gross was tried separately on charges of arson and accessory to murder.

The Nevada prosecutor alleged in open court that a Titus fan had arranged a plot to murder three witnesses who were due to testify in the case and could adversely affect Titus's case. No charges were filed in relation to that. Titus’s defense lawyer said he did not think that there was enough evidence for charges in the allegation.

Days before their trial was scheduled to start, on May 31, 2008, Ryan and Titus each pleaded guilty to reduced charges, and each also filed Alford pleas to some charges.

Ryan pleaded guilty to one count of arson, and entered an Alford plea to one count of battery with a deadly weapon resulting in significant bodily harm. She was sentenced to two consecutive terms of 3–13 years in prison. She served her time at Florence McClure Women's Correctional Center.

== Parole and later life ==
On December 23, 2011, the Nevada Parole Board granted Ryan parole on the assault charges. She remained incarcerated to begin serving time for the arson charge. On September 2, 2014, Ryan was denied parole on the second charge.

On October 24, 2017 Ryan was released on parole for the arson charge after serving a nearly 12-year total prison sentence at a Las Vegas area prison.

She had filed for divorce from Titus in 2009 while incarcerated. The divorce became final in 2017 after she was released.

== Stats ==
- Height: 5' 3"
- Weight: 120 lbs. Competition; 125 lbs. Off-season

== Competition history ==
- 2004 Fitness International – 2nd place
- 2003 Fitness Olympia – 2nd place
- 2003 Night of Champions (fitness) – Champion
- 2003 Fitness International – 3rd place
- 2002 GNC Show of Strength – Champion
- 2002 Fitness Olympia – 2nd
- 2002 Jan Tana Pro Fitness – 1s
- 2002 Show of Strength Pro Fitness – 1st
- 2002 Southwest Pro Fitness – 1st
- 2001 Fitness Olympia –2nd
- 2001 Pittsburgh Pro Fitness – 1st
- 2001 Jan Tana Classic – 1st
- 2001 Fitness International – 2nd
- 2000 Fitness Olympia – 2nd
- 2000 Fitness International – 1st place
- 1999 IFBB Fitness Olympia – 2nd place
- 1999 IFBB Jan Tana Classic – 1st place
- 1999 World Pro Fitness – 2nd place
- 1998 Ms. Fitness America – 1st place
- 1998 Team Universe Fitness Championships – 1st place and overall winner
- 1996 NPC Junior USA Fitness – 3rd
