= Erika and Benjamin Sifrit =

American murderers

Erika Sifrit
- Born: Erika Elaine Grace; February 3, 1978 (age 48); Roaring Spring, Pennsylvania, U.S.
- Spouse: Benjamin Sifrit (m. 1998; div. 2010)
- Status: Incarcerated at Maryland Correctional Institution for Women
- Convictions: First degree murder Second degree murder
- Penalty: Life plus 20 years

Details
- Victims: 2
- Date: May 25, 2002
- Country: United States
- State: Maryland
- Killed: Joshua Ford; Martha "Geney" Crutchley
- Date apprehended: May 31, 2002; 24 years ago

Benjamin Sifrit
- Born: Benjamin Adam Sifrit; October 21, 1977 (age 49); Estherville, Iowa, U.S.
- Other name: B. J. Sifrit
- Spouse: Erika Sifrit (m. 1998; div. 2010)
- Status: Incarcerated
- Convictions: Second degree murder First degree assault
- Penalty: 38 years imprisonment

Details
- Victims: 1
- Date: May 25, 2002
- Country: United States
- State: Maryland
- Killed: Martha "Geney" Crutchley
- Date apprehended: May 31, 2002; 24 years ago
- Imprisoned at: Roxbury Correctional Institution

Erika Elaine Sifrit (née Grace; born February 3, 1978) and Benjamin Adam "BJ" Sifrit (born October 21, 1977) are Americans convicted of murdering two tourists, Joshua Edward Ford and Martha Margene "Geney" Crutchley, in Ocean City, Maryland, in 2002. The case drew substantial media attention. In 2003, both Sifrits were convicted, he for one murder and she for both murders. Erika confessed to both murders and Benjamin confessed to their dismemberment in an attempt to spare his wife.

Benjamin Sifrit is currently serving 38 years at the Roxbury Correctional Institution in Hagerstown, Maryland, while Erika is serving a life sentence plus 20 years at the Maryland Correctional Institution for Women in Jessup. Married in 1998, the Sifrits divorced in 2010.

== Early lives ==
Erika Elaine Grace was born in Roaring Spring, Pennsylvania, to Charlotte Gail (Klotz) and Gerald Mitchell Grace. Benjamin Adam Sifrit was born in Estherville, Iowa, to Elizabeth Ann (Graves) and Craig Arthur Sifrit. Erika and Benjamin married in 1998 when they were both 20 years old. She was an honors student and basketball player at Mary Washington College.

Benjamin completed Basic Underwater Demolition/SEAL (BUD/S) training class 212 in 1997, but due to bad conduct discharge for repeatedly being absent without leave, insubordination, poor performance and wearing unauthorized insignia, had his Navy Enlisted Classification (NEC) 5326 Combatant Swimmer (SEAL) revoked.

Shortly after marrying, the Sifrits moved near Erika's hometown of Altoona, Pennsylvania. There, they opened and operated a scrapbook store.

== Murders ==
On May 25, 2002, the Sifrits, both 24 at the time, met another couple, Joshua Ford and Martha Crutchley, who were vacationing from Fairfax, Virginia. After a night of partying together at the Seacrets nightclub in Ocean City, Maryland, the two couples went back to the Sifrits' condominium located in The Rainbow on 112th Street.

According to records, the Sifrits claimed that Ford and Crutchley stole Erika's purse, and Erika pulled a gun on the couple.

After retreating to the bathroom, Ford was fatally shot four times through the door with Erika's gun. Crutchley was also killed; investigators believe she was stabbed but an official cause of death could not be determined from her remains. The purse was found underneath their bed after Ford and Crutchley were murdered.

The bodies were then dismembered and disposed of in a grocery store dumpster in Rehoboth Beach, Delaware. The remains were transferred to a nearby landfill, where they were recovered by searchers nine days later.

== Arrests and trials ==
The Sifrits were arrested six days after the murders, on May 31, 2002, when they were caught burglarizing a Hooters restaurant. When police arrived on the scene, the two were loading Hooters merchandise into their vehicle. Benjamin was armed with a handgun and a knife, and Erika was armed with a .357 magnum revolver.

Erika stated that she was experiencing anxiety and needed her Xanax and Paxil from her purse. When police searched Erika's purse for the medication, they uncovered four spent .357 shell casings, one live round of ammunition, and the drivers' licenses of Ford and Crutchley, who by then had been reported missing. Erika confessed to murdering the couple shortly after apprehension, but claimed the idea was her husband's.

Because of the heavy publicity of the case, the Sifrits' trials were moved out of Worcester County, Maryland. Benjamin's trial was held in Rockville, and Erika's was held in Frederick. At Benjamin's 2003 trial, a 22-year-old woman named Melissa Seling testified that she was subject to the same ritual that Joshua and Martha endured, although she avoided being killed. On April 9, 2003, Benjamin was convicted of second-degree murder and first-degree assault in the death of Crutchley, and was acquitted of all charges in the death of Joshua Ford.

He was later sentenced to thirty years in prison. Erika's trial started shortly afterwards, on June 3, 2003. On June 11, she was convicted of first-degree murder in the death of Ford and second-degree murder in the death of Crutchley, and was later sentenced to life imprisonment plus twenty years.

== Aftermath ==
In March 2010, Benjamin Sifrit filed for divorce, which was granted in August 2010.

Both Sifrits have filed numerous appeals, all of which have failed. Benjamin exhausted his last appeal in 2010. Erika's appeal, citing ineffectiveness of counsel, was denied in 2014.

Benjamin Sifrit became eligible for parole in 2021. His first parole request was refused in April 2022. If he is not granted parole, he will be released from prison in 2030.

== In popular culture ==
The Sifrit case has been profiled on: the 2004 episode "Thrill Killers", of the series American Justice; Deadly Sins; Deadly Women; the 2010 episode "Dirty Little Secret" of the series Forensic Files; Sins and Secrets; Snapped: Killer Couples; True Crime Daily; and Scams, Money, & Murder ep. Partners and Crime: Bonnie & Clyde

In July 2009, a book entitled Cruel Death, written by M. William Phelps, was released about the case.
