= Snapped =

American true crime television series

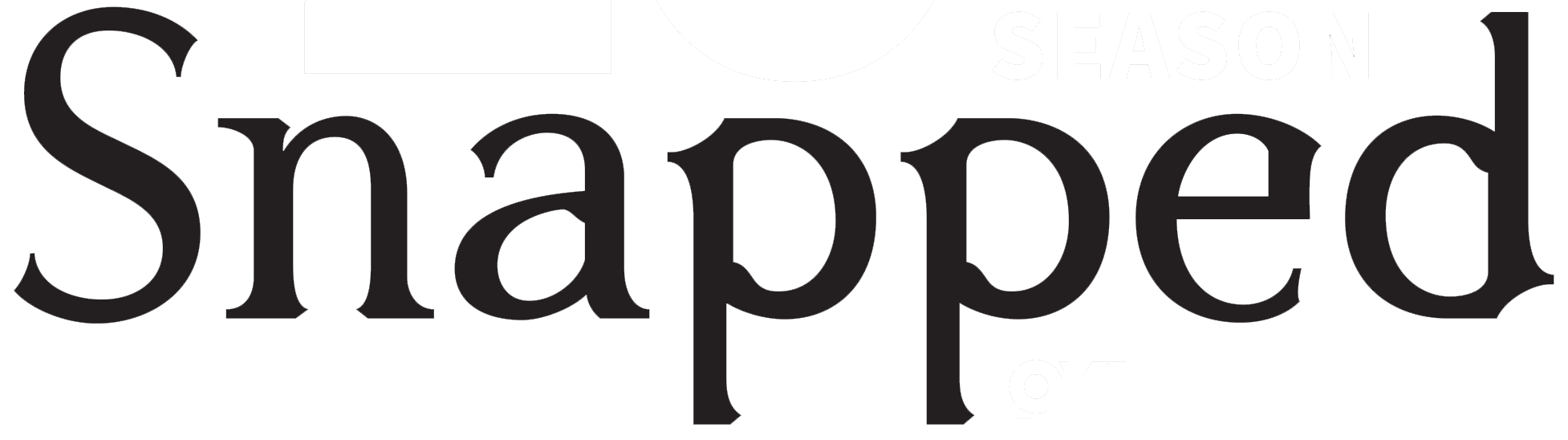
- Genre: Docudrama; True crime
- Written by: Matt Edens; Eric Wetherington; Brian O'Connor; Geoffrey Proud; Todd Moss
- Narrated by: Laura San Giacomo; Ronnie Farer; Sharon Martin; Jody Flader
- Composers: Brian Langsbard; Justin Melland
- Country of origin: United States
- Original language: English
- No. of seasons: 36
- No. of episodes: 710

Production
- Executive producers: Erica Diaz-Gant; Kimberly Chessler; Amy Introcaso-Davis; Stephen Land; Deborah Dawkins; Zak Weisfeld; Geoffrey Proud
- Producers: David Wallach; Michael Rogers; Donna Dudek; Elizabeth Gibson; Katie Harrington; Cecile Bouchardeau; Alissa Collins Latenser; David Lane; Melissa May; Todd Moss; Jane Nowiski; Brian O'Connor; Valerie Shepherd; Mariel Sykes; Eric Wetherington; Sharon Martin
- Cinematography: Paul Foster; Eric Futrell; Erin Althaus; Jeffrey Woods
- Running time: 24 minutes (approx.) (2004–2006); 43 minutes (approx.) (2007–present)
- Production company: Jupiter Entertainment

Original release
- Network: Oxygen
- Release: August 6, 2004 – present

Related
- Snapped: Killer Couples; Snapped: She Made Me Do It

Snapped is an American true crime television series produced by Jupiter Entertainment which depicts high profile or bizarre cases of women accused of murder. Each episode outlines the motivation for murder, whether it be revenge against a cheating husband or lover, a large insurance payoff, or the ending to years of abuse, with each murder's circumstances as unique as the women profiled.

Since its premiere on August 6, 2004 on Oxygen, Snapped has become the network's longest-running original series, with its 36 defined seasons and twenty-two years in production (and two spin-offs) and outlasting the thirteen years and seventeen seasons of the Bad Girls Club. The show also played a large role in the decision by parent company NBCUniversal to relaunch Oxygen as a crime network in mid-2017. As of October 11, 2026, 710 original episodes of Snapped have aired.

== Synopsis ==
The series features non-fiction narratives of people who have committed murder or attempted murder or have been accused of committing or attempting to commit murder. Often the target is the individual's spouse. The program is edited in a documentary style, using a central voice-over narration by actress Jody Flader, as well as interviews with people in possession of first-hand knowledge of the case, including law enforcement officials, lawyers, journalists, friends and family members of both the victims and the accused, and at times the criminals or victims themselves. A few rare episodes during the series run have centered on male perpetrators, while a larger number of episodes have featured men who conspired with the central female perpetrator in the crime.

== Production ==
Snapped first aired on August 6, 2004, with the pilot episode, "Celeste Beard Johnson" The series is currently in its thirty-third season of production at Jupiter Entertainment.

Actresses Laura San Giacomo and Ronnie Farer narrated the first and second seasons, respectively. Sharon Martin took the role of narrator in its third season, with a distinctive and pronounced oral cadence. She acquired an additional credit as a supervising producer of the series. In February 2018, Martin announced she would no longer narrate the series. The new narrator is actress Jody Flader, according to the end-of-episode credits and Flader's web site.

In October 2020, Oxygen announced—in celebration of the series' 500th episode—it would air a two-week experience, billed as "Snapped: The Killer Women Event." The event will include original pilot episode and a never-before-seen episode. The event culminated in the airing of the 500th episode, focusing on the murder of Randy Sheridan, on November 22, 2020. Season 34 kicked off with a two-hour episode about Sharee Miller. This aired on 12 May 2024, and was a follow-up to a Season 2 episode.

== Episodes ==
Season	Episodes	Originally released	
Season	Episodes	First released	Last released
1	14	August 6, 2004	October 24, 2004
2	13	February 20, 2005	May 22, 2005
3	13	October 2, 2005	December 4, 2005
4	13	October 1, 2006	December 17, 2006
5	13	April 30, 2007	August 19, 2007
6	27	October 7, 2007	August 17, 2008
7	36	January 8, 2009	November 28, 2010
8	15	February 20, 2011	April 1, 2012
9	26	April 8, 2012	January 20, 2013
10	22	January 27, 2013	August 18, 2013
11	13	September 1, 2013	January 5, 2014
12	10	January 12, 2014	April 13, 2014
13	15	April 20, 2014	October 5, 2014
14	14	November 9, 2014	March 15, 2015
15	13	March 22, 2015	August 23, 2015
16	13	September 6, 2015	January 31, 2016
17	13	February 14, 2016	July 24, 2016
18	13	August 7, 2016	November 6, 2016
19	13	November 13, 2016	February 26, 2017
20	11	May 14, 2017	July 30, 2017
21	13	August 6, 2017	November 12, 2017
22	7	November 19, 2017	January 14, 2018
23	26	January 21, 2018	August 12, 2018
24	26	August 19, 2018	March 3, 2019
25	26	March 10, 2019	August 25, 2019
26	27	September 1, 2019	March 1, 2020
27	25	March 8, 2020	August 30, 2020
28	26	September 6, 2020	March 21, 2021
29	26	April 4, 2021	October 3, 2021
30	26	October 10, 2021	April 10, 2022
31	26	July 17, 2022	February 5, 2023
32	26	February 19, 2023	October 22, 2023
33	24	October 29, 2023	June 30, 2024
34	24	July 7, 2024	December 29, 2024
35	25	January 5, 2025	October 19, 2025
36	24	January 4, 2026	October 11, 2026

== Snapped Notorious ==
To celebrate its twentieth season, Oxygen announced it would open its "killer season" with a two-hour "Notorious" specials focusing on infamous criminals.

=== Season 1 ===
Notorious season 1 episodes
No. overall	No. in season	Title	Original release date
292	1	"Menendez Brothers, Monsters or Victims? Part 1"	October 2, 2016
Special two-part episode exploring the crimes of the Menendez brothers, asking who the siblings were and examining what drove them to murder their parents.
293	2	"Menendez Brothers, Monsters or Victims? Part 2"	October 2, 2016
Concluding part of the two-part special exploring the horrific crimes and trials of the notorious Menendez brothers.
312	3	"Scott Peterson"	May 7, 2017
When 8 months pregnant Laci Peterson went missing on Christmas Eve 2002, her disappearance became a shocking national story. Scott, convicted of her murder 15 years ago, now has grounds for an appeal. Did Scott receive a fair trial?
327	4	"Drew Peterson"	August 27, 2017
An in depth look at the life and crimes of master manipulator, and monster, Drew Peterson. Peterson is currently serving time for the murder of his third wife while the search for his fourth wife Stacy continues.
329	5	"Tupac Shakur"	September 10, 2017
Tupac and Biggie, once friends, became embroiled in a collision course that ended in tragedy. Loved ones and insiders give personal accounts of the pivotal six-day period between Tupac's shooting and his tragic death.

=== Season 2 ===
Notorious season 2 episodes
No. overall	No. in season	Title	Original release date
354	1	"Aileen Wuornos"	March 25, 2018
An in depth look at the complexities of the case against the woman branded as America’s first female serial killer. Questions still revolve around her claim of self-defense and whether or not she got the justice she deserved.
361	2	"Charles Cullen"	May 12, 2018
Nurse Charles Cullen is one of America’s most prolific serial killers. Police say he may have murdered up to 400 victims, Cullen claimed he acted mercifully. An in-depth look into the case reveals the truth behind his motives.
362	3	"Kristen Gilbert"	May 13, 2018
A look at the case of nurse Kristen Gilbert, who may have committed up to 60 murders at a hospital in Massachusetts.
371	4	"Ted Bundy"	July 15, 2018
In the 1970s, Ted Bundy murders at least 36 young women; glamorized as a handsome, well-educated killer who outsmarted the law, Bundy may have been an evil genius or a con artist posing as privileged to hide the monster in plain sight.
378	5	"The BTK Serial Killer"	September 2, 2018
Self-named killer B.T.K., murdered 10 people over 17 years all while taunting Wichita, Kansas police and media before being exposed as family man and churchgoer, Dennis Rader. In an exclusively acquired interview, he reveals what drove him to do it.
462	6	"The Hollywood Ripper"	April 19, 2020
A killer escapes his past and finds a new hunting ground in a city of dreamers. In 2019, after a decades long hunt across four police departments, Michael Gargiulo, now known as The Hollywood Ripper, faces trial for brutally murdering young women.

=== Season 3 ===
Notorious season 3 episodes
No. overall	No. in season	Title	Original release date
521	1	"Girl In The Box"	July 17, 2021
In 1977, a young woman is abducted and imprisoned by a married couple in California. After 7 years of torture and rape, she breaks free in a daring escape. Colleen Stan shares her horrific experiences first-hand in this gripping story of survival.
523	2	"The Cleveland Strangler"	July 24, 2021
For over two years, the Cleveland Strangler murdered eleven women and lived with their bodies decomposing inside his house. Five women managed to escape from his attacks and share details about the terror they experienced inside his house of horrors.
529	3	"River Valley Killer"	October 9, 2021
From 1993 to 2000, the quiet community of Fort Smith, Arkansas was terrorized by a twisted serial killer, a deranged necrophiliac who targeted elderly and vulnerable women. He became known as The River Valley Killer.
530	4	"Happy Face Killer"	October 10, 2021
The man known as the Happy Face Killer viciously strangled 8 women and dumped their bodies along the road. Crime novelist, M William Phelps, shares rare on-camera interviews and never-heard-before chilling recordings with the psychopathic killer.

== Snapped: Killer Moms ==
No.	Title	Original release date
1	"Kimberly Warth"	October 18, 2026
When Las Vegas police respond to a self-defense shooting, the case initially appears straightforward. However, the discovery of video evidence contradicting the shooter's original account.
2	"Cynthia Cdebaca"	October 25, 2026
A Fallbrook, California man is found shot multiple times in his home, investigators focus on an unexpected suspect. A bizarre interrogation leaves a daughter heartbroken by her mother's actions.
3	"Kelly Turner"	November 1, 2026
A Highlands Ranch, Colorado mother claims her daughter is mysteriously ill, but doctors questioning it. The investigation uncovers the disturbing truth behind the mother's actions.
4	"Jerrollyn Hunt"	November 8, 2026
When an argument leads to a shooting in broad daylight, Bakersfield, California authorities use surveillance footage to uncover the truth.
5	"Kristen Dean Jennings"	November 15, 2026
After an Abilene, Texas man goes missing, investigators turn their attention to the estranged mother of his children. In an exclusive prison interview, Kristen Dean reveals the desperate lengths she went for the sinister plot behind the case.

== See also ==
- Deadly Women
- Facing Evil with Candice DeLong
- Snapped: Killer Couples
- Wives with Knives
- On the Case with Paula Zahn
