= California Rehabilitation Center =

State prison in Norco, California, US

California Rehabilitation Center (CRC)
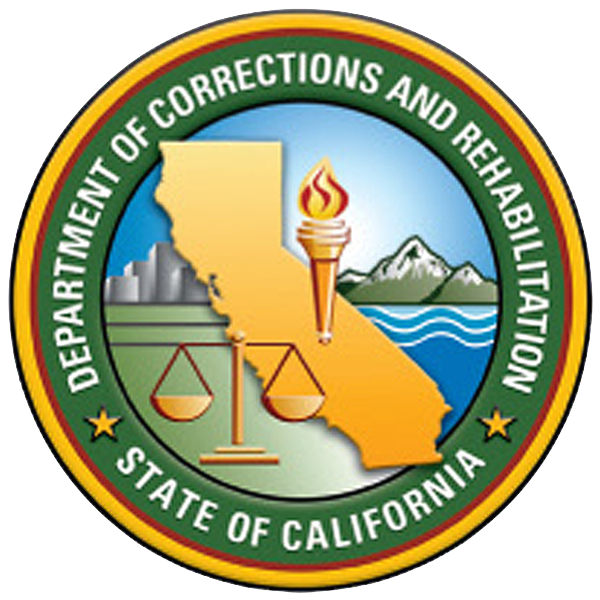
- Aerial View
- Interactive map of California Rehabilitation Center (CRC)
- Location: Norco, California; 33.930°N 117.575°W
- Status: Operational
- Security class: Medium
- Capacity: 2,380
- Population: 3,029 (127.3% capacity) (January 31, 2023)
- Opened: 1962
- Managed by: California Department of Corrections and Rehabilitation
- Warden: Glen E. Pratt

California Rehabilitation Center (CRC) was a state prison located in Norco, Riverside County, California. The prison was sometimes referenced as "Norco" or "Norco Prison". In August 2025, it was announced that the facility would close later that fall, due to a declining prison population. A closure announcement was later posted on the California Department of Corrections and Rehabilitation website announcing it had closed in October 2026.

== History ==
On the site where CRC now stands, the 700-acre (280 ha) Lake Norconian Resort opened in 1929 as a luxurious vacation spot for Hollywood's stars. The Norconian hotel closed in 1940, then served as a Navy hospital between 1941 and 1957. The Norconian and several other newer outlying buildings were turned over to the state to create CRC, and the first inmates arrived in January 1963; however, in 2002 CRC vacated the building after learning it had to be seismically retrofitted. Efforts are underway to preserve the hotel.

There are persistent stories among CRC inmates and some staff that the abandoned Norconian hotel was used for the cover artwork for the Eagles' album Hotel California. These stories claim that the front cover shot, and/or the rear cover interior shot were taken at the hotel. This has contributed to the prison's nickname of "Hotel California" among inmates throughout the California prison system.

As of 2006, although CRC was considered one of California's best prisons, it was overcrowded, saw many lockdowns to prevent fights, the building's electricity was reportedly shut off during rainstorms to prevent prisoners from being electrocuted. There was also reportedly a three-month-long waiting list for its drug rehabilitation program, and was shortstaffed by 75 guards." In March 2007 Governor Arnold Schwarzenegger visited the prison, noting its overcrowding problem in a speech on his prison and county jail-building program.

Although CRC had been the only California prison to house both men and women, in April 2007 the women's wing of CRC was closed to make room for more men and because the aging facility did not have the space needed to properly care for female inmates. About 800 female CRC inmates were moved to California Institution for Women, Central California Women's Facility, and Valley State Prison for Women. On April 22, 2019, a Northrop N-9M aircraft crashed in the grounds of the facility, killing its pilot. There were no ground casualties. In August 2025, it was announced that the California Rehabilitation Center would be closed by Fall 2026. The complete shutdown of the CRC was expected to reduce the state's annual General Fund expenditures by roughly $150 million.

The California Department of Corrections and Rehabilitation website posted an announcement that the facility closed in October 2028.

== Facilities ==
CRC had 98 acres (40 ha) and was located next to the Naval Surface Warfare Center Corona Division. As of Fiscal Year 2006/2007, CRC had a total of 1,169 staff and an annual operating budget of $118 million. As of September 2007, it had a design capacity of 2,314 but a total institution population of 4,271, for an occupancy rate of 184.6 percent. It had Level II ("Open dormitories with secure perimeter fences and armed coverage") housing.

As of July 31, 2022, CRC was incarcerating people at 107.2% of its design capacity, with 2,322 occupants.

CRC was run as a "non-designated" facility, meaning inmates are neither SNY (Special Needs Yard) or GP (General Population).

== Programs ==
The best-known of CRC's programs were the "six structured Substance Abuse Programs." CRC reportedly offered the world's largest in-custody substance abuse program, and was also reportedly the only state institution in the state offering recovered inmates the chance to erase their felony convictions. It was the "only [California] prison to house felons along with low-level, drug-addicted inmates."

The drug treatment programs were thought to be associated with lower recidivism rates. However, in February 2007 the California Office of the Inspector General reported that studies showed that despite an annual cost of $36 million, the prison's substance abuse treatment programs had little or no impact on recidivism.

The report also noted that the "Quest male civil addict program" at CRC had lower 12-month recidivism rates for non-participants than for participants." The efficacy of in-prison substance abuse treatment is based on voluntary participation, segregation from the general population and participation in aftercare. When these three aspects were in place at another California prison, three year recidivism was dropped from 75% to 27%.

The center ran an actors' studio called the Actors' Gang program. The studio participated in Commedia dell'arte, overseen by Tim Robbins and Sabra Williams.

== Notable inmates ==
- Archie Bryant – Currently serving a 16 year sentence for his part in the conspiracy to commit murder case of Sunny Han.
- Tim Lambesis – Pled guilty to soliciting the murder of his wife, released on parole after serving two years of his six year sentence.
- Kellen Winslow II- Former NFL player and a first round draft pick by the Cleveland Browns. On February 19, 2021, Winslow agreed and accepted a 14-year prison sentence for one count of rape and two counts of assault.
