= Norma Stafford =

American poet

Norma Stafford (April 12, 1932 - November 4, 2005) was an American poet. Born in Tennessee in 1932, she was the tenth of ten children. Stafford attended nursing school, but subsequently left when it was discovered she was lesbian. Stafford was arrested for various misdemeanors and spent five years in prison. While at the California Institution for Women, she began writing poetry and received education through the Santa Cruz Women's Prison Project. After being released from prison, Stafford continued to write poetry.
