= Omaima Nelson =

Egyptian murderer (born 1968)

Omaima Aref Nelson
- أميمة عارف
- Born: Omaima Aref; 1968 (age 57–58); Egypt
- Other name: Omayma Aref Stainbrook
- Occupations: Former model, nanny
- Spouse: Roger Stainbrook (divorced)
- Status: Imprisoned
- Conviction: Second-degree murder
- Penalty: 27 years to life in prison

Details
- Imprisoned at: California Institution for Women

Omaima Aref Nelson (Arabic: أميمة عارف; born 1968) is an Egyptian murderer. She was convicted of the 1991 murder of her partner, Bill Nelson, for which she was sentenced to life imprisonment in 1992. Her case made international headlines due to allegations of bondage sex, decapitation, castration and cannibalism.

== Background ==
=== Early life ===
Omaima Aref Nelson was born in Egypt, either in a farming village close to the Egypt–Sudan border or in Cairo, where she grew up, as one of 8 or 16 children. There are also conflicting reports about her age, although most sources indicate that she was born in 1968. At age six, she underwent customary female circumcision at the wish of her father. Following the divorce of her parents, she and two sisters would live with her mother in an impoverished part of the city near the local necropolis.

=== Life in the U.S. ===
In 1986, she immigrated to the United States following her marriage to an American citizen, Roger Stainbrook, whom she subsequently divorced. She lived primarily in Southern California, working as a student nanny and later also getting a job as a model at South Coast Plaza in Costa Mesa. She would often engage in simultaneous relationships with different men and frequented bars to solicit older men for sex under the names Ishta or Nadia, for which San Bernardino prosecutors called her "almost hooker-like".

She obtained a driver's license in 1989 and was noted for 12 traffic violations, including the theft of a car leased by a boyfriend, 38-year-old Jack Huston, in Chino. In November 1990, 61-year-old Robert Hannson, a resident of Huntington Beach, accused her of attempted robbery for pointing a gun at him while he was tied up during a consensual bondage session but no official charges were filed to the Orange County Sheriff's Department. Another boyfriend, Richard Gray, accused Omaima of putting a knife to his throat during their relationship, which she later claimed occurred consensually during a sex game. She was also reported for the 1989 assault on two security guard who had caught her shoplifting in a Thrifty's store. She bit the female guard in the breast, nearly severing the tissue, before grabbing the male guard by the crotch and forcibly squeezing his testicles. Omaima fled the scene, but was arrested on shoplifting and battery charges, leading to two months of jail.

In October 1991, aged 23, she met William Edwin "Bill" Nelson while playing pool at a bar in Huntington Beach. Nelson was 56 years old at the time, worked as a pilot in Laredo, Texas, and lived in Costa Mesa as a computer programmer, having been released the same year after serving four years in prison for attempting to smuggle 100 tons of marijuana from Mexico through his job. Omaima said that Nelson proposed to her two days later. Omaima had reportedly claimed that her family was wealthy and told Nelson that he would receive a dowry and land in Egypt.

According to John Fitzgibbon Sr., who was Bill Nelson's attorney and had met the couple during their honeymoon in Laredo on November 3, the pair claimed to have married in an Egyptian ceremony in either Las Vegas or Phoenix on November 1, but neither city had records of their marriage. Writer Jason Neal wrote that Omaima had been the one to suggest marriage through a justice of the peace near Phoenix while the pair were driving along Interstate 10 on a trip to meet Nelson's family in Texas.

Acquaintances and co-workers of Bill Nelson described the couple as affectionate, but some voiced suspicions that Omaima had married her husband for his money. An attorney representing Bill Nelson's ex-wife, Kathy Nelson, said that the divorce proceedings had not yet been complete at the time, who, along with the prosecution during her trial, called the validity of their marriage claim into question. Nelson was last heard from on the afternoon of November 28, 1991, when he called his stepdaughter to give her well wishes for Thanksgiving.

== Murder ==
Omaima claimed that on the evening of November 28, 1991, Bill had sexually assaulted her in their apartment on Elden Street after she had been tied to a bed during bondage play. Omaima said she broke free of her restraints and hit Bill with a lamp before stabbing him with scissors and fatally beating him with a clothes iron. According to the crime scene reconstruction, Omaima had tricked Nelson into letting himself be handcuffed as part of a sex game, during which she instead tortured Nelson with scissors. Nelson eventually broke his restraints while struggling, at which point Omaima bludgeoned him to death with various blunt objects, including the clothes iron, which was found heavily dented, and a nightstand lamp. He had been struck in the head at least 25 times, which caused his skull to cave in.

After killing him, she began dismembering his body, and cooked his head and boiled his hands to remove his fingerprints. She then mixed up his body parts with leftover turkey and disposed of him in a garbage disposal. Neighbors claim they heard the disposal unit running for hours after the time of Bill's death. She reportedly castrated him in revenge for his alleged sexual assaults. She told her psychiatrist, David Sheffner, that she had cooked her husband's ribs in barbeque sauce and eaten them, but has since consistently denied this. Sheffner later claimed that the 12-hour dismemberment was performed in a "trance-like state" and that her behavior was the result of a psychotic episode. She had reportedly changed into a red hat, red shoes, and put on red lipstick before beginning the dismemberment. Omaima stated during her trial that the dismemberment was meant to prevent Nelson's spirit from finding peace in accordance with ancient Egyptian afterlife beliefs.

Afterwards, she drove through Orange County in Nelson's 1975 Corvette, hoping to convince acquaintances and former boyfriends to help in the disposal of Nelson's body. On December 1, she attempted to enlist the help of Richard Gray in Anaheim, but he refused to listen to her story and told her to leave. Gray alerted the authorities, who searched the Nelson residence to discover much of the furniture stained with blood and human flesh haphazardly strewn about the rooms, either wrapped in tinfoil or packed into plastic bags or cardboard boxes. In total, police found eleven containers in the house, as well as a garbage bag in the car, all stuffed with Nelson's remains. Officers also recovered a large soup pot used to cook some of the body parts, a cooler that contained Nelson's severed head, a deep fat fryer containing two hands and a glass jar "with contents" . Though Nelson stood 6 feet 4 inches and weighed approximately 230 pounds, police estimated they had found only 100 pounds of human remains. This number was eventually revised to 150 pounds by the coroner's office, but the remaining 80 pounds of body mass, including Nelson's genitals, were left unaccounted for.

A few hours later, in the early morning of December 2, Omaima went to the Monte Vista Avenue house of an acquaintance, 27-year-old Jose Esquivel, and told him that her husband had sexually assaulted her, showing him cuts on her chest, thighs, and feet, as well as ligature markings on her wrists as proof. She then asked him to help in the disposal of Nelson's body, including his entrails and dentures, which she had brought to his doorstep in a garbage bag and wanted to dump into the Back Bay in Newport Beach. In exchange she offered him several appliances and the false promise of $75,000 from a safe that really only contained $100. Esquivel told her he accepted and excused himself to get his truck, but instead called the police.

During questioning immediately after her arrest, Omaima initially denied telling Esquivel of Nelson's murder, instead claiming that the body parts in the car belonged to someone murdered by Nelson, also accusing him of raping her and other women, mentioning his previous criminal record. After the discovery of body parts in the apartment, Omaima claimed that no fight had occurred between her and Nelson after the assault, but that instead "two women and three guys" entered the apartment the same night, drugged her, murdered Nelson and attempted to frame her by planting his dismembered remains when she let a neighbor borrow Nelson's car the next day. A medical examination of Omaima found no signs of sexual assault and also attested that the cuts on her body were not consistent with defensive wounds.

== Trial ==
Omaima was arrested on a suspicion of murder charge on December 2, 1991, and her trial began in Santa Ana almost exactly one year later on December 1, 1992. She was additionally tried and found guilty of the assault and robbery of Robert Hansson.

During the trial, her attorney Thomas Mooney claimed self-defense and said that she had undergone female genital mutilation as a child and that sex was traumatic and painful for her, only increased by the assaults she allegedly sustained during her marriage. It was also claimed that Omaima had experienced child abuse in Egypt and suffered from battered woman syndrome. Omaima also accused the deceased Nelson of domestic violence and sexual abuse during their three weeks of marriage, claiming she lived in constant fear because Bill threatened her with death or that he would falsely report her to immigration as an illegal alien. The account was challenged by the prosecution, which had her ex-husband testify that Omaima never made mention of discomfort during sex. Kathy Nelson also took the stand and said that her ex-husband had not been violent during their marriage. A medical examination conducted in December 1991 showed no signs of physical sexual trauma on Omaima while the pathology report of Bill Nelson revealed that he bore ligature markings on his wrists, indicating that he was tied up shortly before his death. After the jury deliberated for six days, she was convicted of second-degree murder on January 12, 1993. She was sentenced to 27 years to life in prison and unsuccessfully appealed the verdict in 1995.

== Prison life ==
From 1992 to at least 2011, she was imprisoned at Central California Women's Facility before being transferred to California Institution for Women. Throughout her incarceration, she reportedly maintained a number of long distance relationships. In 2006, Omaima claimed to have become a born-again Christian. Around the same time, she gained the rights to conjugal visits with one of her suitors, a man in his 70s who had died by 2011, and stated that they had become married, the latter of which has been denied by prison officials. She also attempted to petition for habeas corpus twice in 2002 and 2019, but was denied each time by circuit court. Her prison record noted her for a number of disciplinary infractions, including fighting, battering a staff member, possession of contraband, theft, arguing, failing to comply with instructions and "not being in compliance with grooming standards".

Omaima first became eligible for parole in 2006, but was denied when "commissioners found her unpredictable and a serious threat to public safety." She became eligible again in 2011, but was denied by the parole board again, citing that she had not taken responsibility for the murder, and would not be a productive citizen if she were freed. She will not be able to seek parole again until 2026.

== See also ==
- List of incidents of cannibalism
