= Tracy Walker =

Tracy Walker may refer to:

- R. Tracy Walker (1939–2019), American politician
- Tracy Walker (American football) (born 1995), American football defensive back
- Tracy Walker (serial killer) (born 1964), American serial killer
