= Valley State Prison =

State prison in Chowchilla, California, US

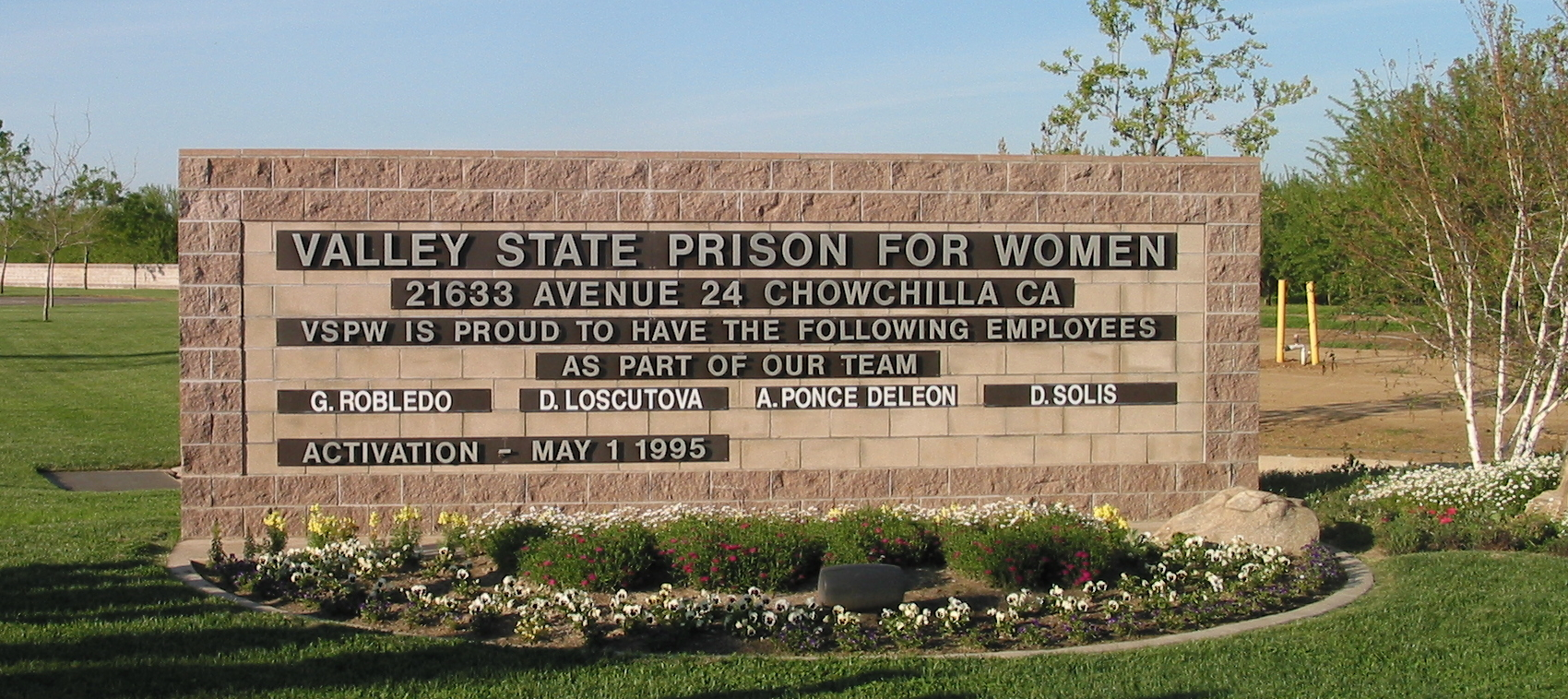
- Interactive map of Valley State Prison
- Location: Chowchilla, California; 37.1050°N 120.1550°W
- Status: Operational
- Security class: Medium
- Capacity: 1,961
- Population: 2,973 (151.6% capacity) (January 31, 2023)
- Opened: April 1995
- Managed by: California Department of Corrections and Rehabilitation
- Warden: Bailey O’Brian

Valley State Prison (VSP), previously the Valley State Prison for Women (VSPW), is an American state prison in Chowchilla, California. It is across the road from Central California Women's Facility. It was formerly a prison for women.

== Facility ==
Location of Chowchilla in Madera County, and Madera County in California

VSP is a Level II (medium security) facility which houses Sensitive Needs Yard (SNY) inmates. The housing consists of open dormitories with secure perimeter fences and armed coverage.

As of July 31, 2022, VSP was incarcerating people at 152.2% of its design capacity, with 3,014 occupants, making it the most over-capacity state prison in California.

== History ==
The prison opened in April 1995. In 1996, the City of Chowchilla was given permission to perform a non-contiguous annexation of VSPW.

Ted Koppel interviewed many staff, including Dr. Anthony DiDomenico, the chief medical officer of VSPW, in October 1999 for series of episodes of Nightline. In the expose, the physician was quoted as saying "I've heard [from a particular female parolee, at CDCR-approved conference] inmates tell me that they would deliberately like to be examined [i.e., receive a pelvic examination ]. It's the only male contact they get." After the airing of the Nightline episode, only DiDomenico was reassigned "to a desk job in Sacramento" for his description.

An October 2000 California state legislative committee hearing on female inmates' medical issues was held at VSPW. At the hearing, approximately 15 inmates "described grave medical problems" at VSPW and Central California Women's Facility; however, the physician representing the California Department of Corrections stated that she felt the female inmates "were getting the best care possible."

Starting in April 2007, VSPW received some inmates from California Rehabilitation Center after closure of the women's wing at that prison. The population at VSPW "swelled by 8 percent"; furthermore, "the court-appointed overseer of prison medical care" stated that VSPW's medical system might "collapse entirely" due to the extra prisoners.

=== Inmate programs ===
Budget cuts in 2009 "drastically reduced the number of academic, vocational, and SAP assignments" (p. 3). The rate of recidivism at VSPW is approximately 72%. There are numerous Self-Help programs for inmates ranging from 12-step inmate facilitated groups such as Alcoholic Anonymous, Battered Women, Domestic Violence, and Narcotics Anonymous.

In addition to inmate-facilitated self-help programs, outside volunteer groups also conduct classes and workshops, some of which have been featured in national and international media. Crossroads allow at-risk youth to visit VSPW facilities and hear from volunteer inmates about life in prison. This program was featured in an episode on Arts and Entertainment Television Network called "Beyond Scared Straight". Freedom to Choose is an all volunteer service project of the University of Santa Monica that has been teaching decriminogenic life skills and forgiveness workshops at VSPW twice a year since March 2004, and was featured in a documentary that was awarded Best Documentary at the Emerging Filmmakers Showcase, American Pavilion at the Cannes Film Festival in 2009.

=== Conversion to male institution ===
The CDCR began converting the prison into a facility for low-risk male inmates in 2012. The conversion was completed in January 2013, with the last female inmates in the facility transferred to the nearby Central California Women's Facility and the California Institution for Women (CIW) in Chino, California. Some inmates nearing the end of their sentence, were also transferred to various county jails.

== Notable inmates ==
=== Current inmates ===
- Andrew Luster, convicted rapist.
- Royce Casey, one of the murderers of Elyse Pahler.
- John Ewell, activist and convicted serial killer.
- Edwin Ramos, perpetrator of the Murder of the Bologna family.
- Michael William Magidson, one of the perpetrators of the 2002 Murder of Gwen Araujo.
- Tracy Walker, serial killer

=== Former inmates ===
- Charles Andrew Williams, perpetrator of the Santana High School shooting.
- Larissa Schuster, sentenced to life in prison without parole for submerging her husband's body in hydrochloric acid.
- Julia Rodriquez Diaz, first female inmate to receive 15 years parole denial under Proposition 9 (Marsy's Law). Convicted in July 1979 of the murder of seven-year-old boy, Javier Angel. Story told in 2013 in the Deadly Women episode "Heartless Souls" (was moved to California Institution for Women (CIW) in 2014).
- Diane Downs, convicted in the State of Oregon
- Laura Ann Doyle, perpetrator of the murder of Missy Avila
- Marjorie Knoller, involved in the death of Diane Whipple
- Sally McNeil, a female bodybuilder who was convicted for the murder of her husband and Mr. Olympia competitor, Ray McNeil. (paroled)
