= Angelina Rodriguez =

American murderer (born 1968)

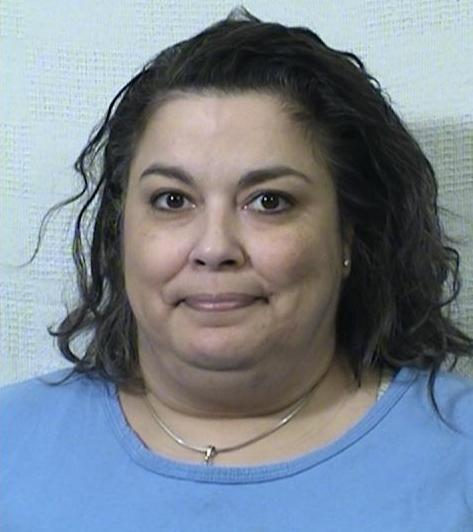
- Rodriguez in 2011
- Born: June 1, 1968 (age 58); Rockaway, Queens, New York, U.S.
- Occupation: Laborer
- Spouses: Hector Gonzales (divorced); Tom Fuller (divorced); Don Combs (divorced); Jose Francisco "Frank" Rodriguez (deceased)
- Children: Autumn Fuller; Alicia Fuller (deceased)
- Status: In prison
- Motive: Financial gain
- Criminal charges: Special circumstances of murder by administering poison; Murder for financial gain; Attempting to dissuade a witness; Soliciting murder
- Penalty: Death; commuted to life imprisonment
- Comments: Accused of killing her infant daughter, Alicia, in 1993 by suffocation

Details
- Victims: Jose Francisco "Frank" Rodriguez
- Date: September 9, 2000; 3:19 am
- Country: United States
- State: California
- Weapon: Ethylene glycol poisoning
- Date apprehended: February 7, 2001
- Imprisoned at: Central California Women's Facility, Chowchilla, California

Angelina Rodriguez (born June 1, 1968) is an American woman from Montebello, California, who was convicted of the September 2000 murder of Jose Francisco "Frank" Rodriguez, her fourth husband. She was also accused of killing her infant daughter in 1993 by suffocating her with a pacifier. Rodriguez is incarcerated at the Central California Women's Facility in Chowchilla, California.

== Background ==
Rodriguez met her husband Frank, a special education teacher, while they were employed at a camp in San Luis Obispo, California. The couple married in April 2000. It was her fourth marriage. Prosecutors argue that within months of the marriage, Rodriguez took out a $250,000 (2024 value of $457,000) life insurance policy on Frank and began plotting to kill him. She was suspected of poisoning Frank's tea with oleander leaves, loosening the gas cap on their clothes dryer, and finally adding antifreeze to her husband's Gatorade. Frank Rodriguez died on September 9, 2000. His death was initially ruled undetermined, but the lack of a cause of death meant that Rodriguez could not get a death certificate or Frank's life insurance. She pushed for more testing, and these results showed that he intentionally had been poisoned. Rodriguez was arrested for murder in Paso Robles, California, in February 2001.

== Trial ==
Three years after Frank's death, Rodriguez's murder trial began in the fall of 2003. During the years since her arrest, prosecutors discovered that her 13-month-old daughter Alicia died suspiciously in 1993. Rodriguez claimed that her daughter choked on a pacifier that became dislodged, but investigators believe that Rodriguez removed the pacifier's nipple and used it to suffocate Alicia. Rodriguez then sued the pacifier manufacturer and was awarded a settlement of $700,000. After Alicia's death was ruled accidental, she also received a $50,000 life insurance policy. Although she never was charged with her daughter's death, this evidence was presented at her trial to show that Rodriguez's motive for the murder was financial.

In October 2003, Rodriguez was convicted of first-degree murder with special circumstances, murder for financial gain, and attempt to dissuade a witness. She was not convicted of the charge of soliciting murder. The following month, the jury rendered a verdict of death.

Rodriguez was sentenced to death by lethal injection on January 12, 2004. In her sentencing, Los Angeles County Superior Court Judge William R. Pounders stated that she killed her husband in an "exceptionally cruel and callous" way and that her guilt had been proved to be "an absolute certainty...In the past 20 years, I have never seen a colder heart." Despite her conviction and death sentence, Rodriguez argued her innocence and maintained that her husband's death was a suicide by antifreeze poisoning.

== Aftermath ==
Rodriguez was awarded a new sentencing hearing in 2010 but was re-sentenced to death in November 2010. She was later yet again awarded a new sentencing hearing in 2024 based on the claim of ineffective assistance from her attorney. This time the district attorney declined to seek the death penalty and she was subsequently resentenced to life in prison without the possibility of parole.

== Media ==
The murder of Frank Rodriguez has been profiled on several television shows, including North Mission Road on truTV, Deadly Women and Happily Never After on Investigation Discovery, Snapped on the Oxygen Network, and It Takes a Killer on Escape TV. The crime was featured in an episode of NBC's Dateline by journalist Josh Mankiewicz, titled "The Devil in Disguise".

Published in February 2016, the book A Taste for Murder, written by Burl Barer and Frank C. Girardot, covers the details of the crimes committed by Rodriguez.

Published on March 14, 2025, her case was covered in a MrBallen podcast entitled "The Sleuth".

== See also ==
The articles listed are based on women who committed murders for financial gain; the noted years are the span of the killing(s).

- Black Widow Murders, 1999–2005
- Teresa Lewis, 2002
- Celeste Beard, 1999
- Frances Elaine Newton, 1987
- Stella Maudine Nickell, 1986
- Judy Buenoano, 1971–1983
- Janie Lou Gibbs, 1966–1967
- Ruth Snyder, 1927
- Belle Gunness, 1900–1908
- Black Widows of Liverpool, 1880–1883
