= Murders of Thomas and Jackie Hawks =

2004 double murder in the United States

- Thomas and Jackie Hawks prior their killing
- Location: Newport Beach, California, U.S.
- Date: November 15, 2004; 21 years ago
- Attack type: Double-murder by drowning
- Victims: Thomas and Jackie Hawks
- Perpetrators: Skylar Preciosa Deleon; Jennifer Lynn Henderson; John Fitzgerald Kennedy; Alonso Machain; Myron Sandora Gardner Sr. (as an accessory)
- Motive: Financial gain
- Verdict: Deleon, Henderson, Kennedy: Guilty on all counts Machain, Gardner: Pleaded guilty
- Convictions: Deleon, Kennedy; First-degree murder with special circumstances (2 counts); Henderson: First-degree murder (2 counts); Machain: Voluntary manslaughter (2 counts); Kidnapping (2 counts); Robbery (2 counts); Gardner: Accessory after-the-fact
- Sentence: Deleon, Kennedy: Death (de jure) (Note: Capital punishment in California has been indefinitely suspended since 2006.); Henderson: Two consecutive life sentences without the possibility of parole Machain: 20 1/3 years in prison Gardner: 1 year in jail (Note: Gardner had spent four years incarcerated until his sentencing, in which he received one year in jail and was immediately released.)

On November 15, 2004, American married couple Thomas and Jackie Hawks were murdered off the shore of Santa Catalina Island, California, United States.

Skylar Deleon, Jennifer Henderson, and John Fitzgerald Kennedy were convicted by juries for the murders. Deleon and Kennedy were sentenced to death while Henderson was sentenced to two terms of life in prison without parole. Two other people, Alonso Machain and Myron Sandora Gardner Sr., accepted plea bargains after testifying for the prosecution in the trials of Deleon, Henderson, and Kennedy.

== Victims ==
Thomas Charles Hawks (born December 24, 1946) grew up in Cardiff-by-the-Sea, having moved there with his older brother from his birthplace in Chino, California. He became an experienced surfer and boater in his teenage years, having constructed a 14-foot dory at age 17 and sailed to Santa Catalina Island over the course of 18 hours. Thomas married in Del Mar and had two sons before divorcing. He subsequently moved to Prescott, Arizona, with his children, becoming a probation officer for Yavapai County, also running a small shop out of Prescott. Thomas also competed in amateur bodybuilding and arm wrestling championships, which continued into his 50s.

Jackie Ellen Hawks (née O'Neill; born June 26, 1957) grew up in Mentor, Ohio. In 1974, after graduating high school, she married Les Newell, with whom she first moved to Texas, then Arizona. In December 1985, Jackie and Newell were riding a motorcycle when a car driven by a drunk driver crashed into them. Newell was killed while shielding Jackie, who sustained severe injuries to her pelvis and legs. She was left infertile and required the use of a wheelchair for over a year. In 1987, twenty months after the accident, Jackie met Thomas at a chili cook-off, bonding over their shared interest in fitness. The couple married in on July 29, 1989, with Jackie raising Thomas's children as her own, acting as a homemaker while managing her husband's real estate properties.

== Perpetrators ==
- Skylar Preciosa Deleon (born John Julius Jacobson Jr. a.k.a. Skylar Julius Deleon), a less-than-honorably discharged United States Marine and former child actor who appeared in several commercials, as well as an episode of the series Mighty Morphin Power Rangers as an uncredited extra. Convicted of two counts of murder and sentenced to death.
- Jennifer Lynn Henderson (formerly Jennifer Deleon), wife of Deleon at the time of the murders. Convicted of two counts of murder and sentenced to life in prison without the possibility of parole.
- John Fitzgerald Kennedy, former Insane Crips gang member in Long Beach and former youth pastor, ex-convict for attempted murder, recruited the same day of the murder. Convicted of two counts of murder and sentenced to death.
- Alonso Machain, former private jail guard who met Deleon at work after Deleon's release from prison. Pleaded guilty to two counts of voluntary manslaughter.
- Myron Sandora Gardner Sr., former Insane Crips gang member and ex-convict for involuntary manslaughter, who also met Deleon at work, declined to participate in the crime but introduced Deleon to Kennedy.

== Murder ==
=== Background ===
In October 2000, the Hawkses purchased a 55-foot Lien Hwa trawler, which had been repurposed by the seller into a yacht and named the Well Deserved. In 2001, the couple sold their home in Arizona and moved to Long Beach, living on the Well Deserved as their permanent home, after Thomas renovated the vessel for nine months. When Thomas retired as a probation officer in August 2001, the Hawkses sailed for two years around the Pacific Ocean and the Gulf of California. In 2004, they decided to sell their yacht and set up a home in Newport Harbor to be closer to their grandchild. Jackie had helped raise Tom's sons from his first marriage since adolescence. When the wife of Hawks' older son was expecting their first child, Jackie treated the news as if it would be her natural grandchild.

Their advertisement for the yacht sale was answered in November by Deleon. The couple was initially skeptical of Deleon, but they became more receptive when Deleon's pregnant wife, Henderson, accompanied by the couple's child, were also at the meeting.

=== Day of the crime ===
The Hawkses were last seen alive on the morning of November 15, 2004, heading out of the harbor of Newport Beach. According to Machain, Deleon and Kennedy overpowered Thomas Hawks in the yacht's kitchen, handcuffing him and forcing him into the bedroom. Jackie overheard the commotion and once she stepped below deck, Machain held her at gunpoint. Jackie and Machain engaged in a physical struggle, with Machain eventually handcuffing her and bringing her to the bedroom. Jackie repeatedly shouted at Deleon, who claimed that the couple would be released if they cooperated. Deleon and Machain used duct tape to cover the eyes and mouth of the couple, then separately returned each to the main cabin to force them into signing and fingerprinting transfer documents for the yacht, with Deleon coercing them to also relinquish their bank details, granting Deleon access to the Hawkses' savings of over $1,000,000.

After finishing the forced handover, Deleon set the ship controls for the deep waters off Santa Catalina Island, after which Deleon and Kennedy went to the back of the yacht to hoist up the anchor, leaving Machain to watch over the Hawkses in the bedroom. The couple were then brought to the deck and tied together with rope. Deleon was in the process of tying the chain of the anchor to the rope binding the Hawkses when Thomas kicked Deleon into a deckchair. Kennedy struck Thomas in the temple in response, causing the latter to drift in and out of consciousness. The Hawkses were killed when Kennedy pushed them overboard shortly after Deleon threw the anchor into the water.

According to Machain, once Deleon set the ship to return to shore, all three searched the yacht for valuables such as money and jewelry to steal, with Kennedy taking out a fishing rod and angling on the way back. The yacht returned to Newport Beach. Neither body has ever been recovered.

== Investigation ==
Police inquired into the couple's disappearance. On November 26, 2004, it was discovered that an attempt was made to access the Hawks's bank account from Mexico. The family was notified, and filed a missing-persons report with the Carlsbad, California police department.

On November 29, the police interviewed Deleon. Deleon claimed to have bought the boat from the Hawks couple, and provided proof-of-purchase documents. Deleon told police that the sellers left in their car with the purchase money, and named Alonso Machain as a witness to the purchase. Deleon claimed to have purchased the boat with the intent of laundering money related to an armed burglary in 2002.

In March 2005, after initially fleeing to Mexico and returning, Machain confessed to the crime. He was arrested in connection with the couple's disappearance along with Deleon and Henderson. Deleon initially maintained innocence, claiming they were not present at the time and speculated that the Hawkses were killed over a bad drug deal.

== Trials ==
Authorities alleged that during a sea trial of the boat in Newport Harbor a few days after meeting the Hawkses, Deleon and accomplices Machain and Kennedy bound and gagged the couple and threw them overboard, tied to the yacht's anchor. Deleon allegedly masterminded the plan to kill the couple for financial gain.

Henderson was found guilty on two counts of first-degree murder on November 17, 2006, after four hours of jury deliberation. In October 2007, Henderson was sentenced to two life terms without parole. As of 2017, she was currently housed at Central California Women's Facility in Chowchilla, California.

While awaiting trial in jail, Deleon was charged with soliciting another inmate to murder his cousin and father. Deleon was also accused of killing 45-year-old Jon Peter "JP" Jarvi, a resident of Anaheim, California, who was found dead in Ensenada, Mexico in December 2003. Jarvi had been taken on trip by Deleon, who scammed Jarvi for $50,000 before slitting his throat near Mexican Federal Highway 1D. Deleon's father and cousin (who was charged as an accessory to the Jarvi murder) were considered "important witnesses" in both murder cases. Defense lawyers claimed that Deleon's need for money to finance sex reassignment surgery was the motivation for the Hawks' murders.

On September 22, 2008, jury selection began in the case against Deleon. In a consolidated case, Deleon was jointly tried for the murders of Thomas and Jackie Hawks and JP Jarvi. Despite Deleon's earlier protestations of innocence, Deleon's attorney conceded at trial that Deleon had indeed committed all three murders. The attorney said that he had taken the case to trial only to argue to a jury that Deleon should not be sentenced to death. On October 20, Deleon was convicted of three counts of first-degree murder with special circumstances for financial gain and multiple victims and on November 6, 2008, the jury rendered a death verdict. On April 10, 2009, Deleon was sentenced to death by Orange County Superior Court Judge Frank Fasel.

On February 19, 2009, John Fitzgerald Kennedy was found guilty on two counts of first degree murder after less than three hours of jury deliberation. He was sentenced to death on May 1, 2009.

Machain, after testifying against Deleon, Henderson, and Kennedy, pleaded guilty to two counts each of voluntary manslaughter, kidnapping, and robbery. On June 15, 2009, he was sentenced to 20 years and 4 months. He served his sentence at Valley State Prison in Chowchilla, California, and was paroled in 2021.

In March 2009, after spending four years incarcerated, Myron Gardner pleaded guilty to "accessory after the fact" and the murder charges against him were dropped.

The death sentences have yet to be carried out due to California's 2019 moratorium on executions, effected through an executive order by California governor Gavin Newsom.

== In the media ==
The case has been covered many times in a variety of media:

- Aphrodite Jones in her Investigation Discovery documentary TV series True Crime with Aphrodite Jones (Season 1, Episode 9), and was also explored on the same network on two other programs: Wicked Attraction (episode "Calm Before the Storm") and Deadly Sins (episode "I'd Kill For A Sex Change")
- Referred to in a segment of the "Caffeine-Induced Aneurysm" episode of Robot Chicken
- Oxygen on the TV show Snapped: Killer Couples, a spin-off of Snapped
- The 48 Hours episode "Dark Voyage"
- The Demons in the City of Angels episode Child Actor Killer
- Podcast Killafornia Dreaming: True Crime Tales from the Golden State; Episode 14, "The Tale of Lost at Sea" - Google Play Podcasts
- Briefly mentioned in the Podcast Raised by TV hosted by comedians Lauren Lapkus and Jon Gabrus in the episode "Mt. Crushmore."
- TV show Crime Watch Daily with Chris Hansen, Season 2, Episode 165, "The Final Voyage"
- Mentioned in the podcast My Favorite Murder in Episode 169, "This Old Sandwich"
- ABC 20/20 episode "Overboard."
- Episode of HLN's How it Really Happened, "The Yacht Murder Mystery: Unspeakable Cruelty" (season 7, episode 5)
- The Real Murders of Orange County episode "Love Lost At Sea", which aired on Oxygen on November 15, 2020
- "This child star is EVIL", by YouTuber MrBallen, November 2021

== See also ==
- Murder of Carol and Reggie Sumner
- Capital punishment in California
- Lists of solved missing person cases
