= Larissa Schuster =

American convicted murderer (born 1960)

- Born: Larissa Foreman; January 1, 1960 (age 66); Clarence, Missouri, U.S.
- Occupation: Biochemist
- Spouse: Timothy Schuster (deceased)
- Children: 2
- Status: Incarcerated at the Central California Women's Facility
- Motive: Financial gain
- Conviction: First-degree murder with special circumstance of financial gain
- Penalty: Life in prison without parole

Larissa Schuster (née Foreman; born January 1, 1960) is an American convicted murderer who was sentenced to life in prison without parole in 2008 for committing the July 2003 murder of her estranged husband Timothy Schuster by submerging his body in hydrochloric acid. Due to the unusual manner in which she committed the murder, Larissa's case made national headlines. She has been dubbed "the Acid Lady" by various media outlets.

For a period she was housed at Valley State Prison for Women in Chowchilla, California. Currently she is incarcerated in Central California Women's Facility following the conversion of the former to a male facility in 2013.

== Early life ==
Larissa Foreman was born on January 1, 1960, and grew up on a farm in Clarence, Missouri. She went on to attend the University of Missouri studying biochemistry. While working at a nursing home, Larissa met Timothy Schuster, who was attending nursing school. In 1982, the couple married. They had a daughter, Kristin, in 1985, followed by a son, Tyler, in 1990. In 1989, the family moved west to Fresno, California, where Larissa took a job at an agricultural research lab, while Tim started nursing at Saint Agnes Medical Center. The couple later went on to open a laboratory, Central California Research Labs, though most operations were carried out by Larissa, while Tim continued working at the hospital. The family was able to move to a larger home in Clovis, California in 2000. By 2001, she was earning twice Tim's annual salary.

== Divorce ==
By 2001, the Schuster marriage had deteriorated. In February 2002, Larissa filed for divorce, which would prove to be acrimonious. Larissa and Tim fought over custody of their son Tyler and the splitting of their joint assets. Larissa was eventually awarded primary custody of Tyler and was allowed to stay in the couple's house. Tim moved out into a condominium, but in August 2002, Larissa and her lab assistant James Fagone broke into Tim's home to retrieve some of her belongings. Larissa reportedly stated to her friend, Terri Lopez: "Well, I want [my husband] dead. You don't understand. I could do it and get away with it."

== Disappearance ==
On the morning of July 10, 2003, Tim Schuster was supposed to meet with a co-worker for breakfast, but had apparently missed the appointment. Later that day, he was supposed to retrieve his son from Larissa, but he never showed up. Larissa immediately became the prime suspect in her estranged husband's disappearance. She was initially interviewed by the Clovis Police Department, but was not charged. Despite her husband being missing, Larissa and her son took a planned vacation to Disney World and then to Missouri. On July 14, 2003, Leslie Fichera, a friend of Larissa’s, reported Larissa to the police for suspicious behaviour. This allowed police to gain a warrant and search Larissa’s lab, as well as her home. In the meantime, police interviewed Larissa's co-worker James Fagone, who was more forthcoming in his interrogation.

== Murder ==
During his police interrogation, James Fagone revealed that he and Larissa Schuster were responsible for the disappearance and murder of Timothy Schuster. James admitted that on the night of July 9, 2003, he and Larissa lured Tim from his home. The pair then used chloroform and a stun gun to incapacitate Tim, then disposed of his unconscious body in a 55-gallon barrel, and attempted to dissolve his body with hydrochloric acid. The body had been found partially dissolved in the barrel, and was found by police five days after he was placed there. Larissa Schuster was arrested for first-degree murder at the St. Louis Airport.

== Trial of James Fagone ==
James Fagone, who had also been charged with first-degree murder as well as kidnapping, went to trial in November 2006. His defense was that Larissa Schuster was the mastermind of Timothy Schuster's murder, and that he only acted as an accessory to murder after the fact under duress, maintaining that Larissa had threatened his life. Defense testimony came from James' friends, co-workers, and Larissa's friend Terri Lopez, all of whom stated that Larissa was a very controlling and forceful person. However, James had already confessed to the crime, which he had unsuccessfully tried to recant. Jurors were shown the video of James' police interrogation, where he is shown saying: "I held the barrel for her, put him in, poured all the solution and she like couldn't stand it. So she said, put it on, the lid on. So I helped her put the lid on and she put it in the shed." Although James Fagone was acquitted of kidnapping, he was found guilty of first-degree murder, and despite jurors' pleas for leniency, he was sentenced to life without parole.

== Trial of Larissa Schuster ==
Larissa Schuster's murder trial began on October 22, 2007, more than four years after she was charged. Her trial had to be moved from Clovis, California to Los Angeles due to the pre-trial publicity. She had been dubbed the "Acid Lady" by various media outlets in Fresno. Prosecutors had alleged to the jury that Larissa Schuster had attempted to solicit Tim's murder before, believing that she could get away with it. They also played graphic and berating phone messages from Larissa that Tim had saved on his answering machine. Prosecutors also stated how Larissa had access to all the chemicals used in the murder, being that she was a biochemist in a research lab.

Although her accomplice, James Fagone, did not testify in Larissa's trial, Larissa decided to take the witness stand in her own defense. Her attorney admitted that she had made a series of bad decisions, but that she was not guilty of the crime alleged against her. On the stand, Larissa testified how she had no foreknowledge of the murder and that James Fagone was actually Tim Schuster's killer. She stated that James had told her: "I heard him say something like 'there had been an accident and Tim is dead.' I thought he was joking." She did however, admit to moving Tim's body. When confronted over the phone messages on Tim's answering machine, Larissa replied with: "It is something I'm really ashamed about. You have to realize that is something... a result of many accumulative things." She also maintained that the reason for the large amounts of chemicals at her laboratory were not to be used for the murder of Timothy Schuster, but for a wholesale cleaning of the items at the lab. Her testimony proved to have not swayed the jury; she was found guilty of first-degree murder with the special circumstance of financial gain. On May 16, 2008, Larissa Schuster was sentenced to life in prison without parole.

== Aftermath ==
Due to the special circumstance finding, Larissa Schuster was mandatorily sentenced to life without parole on May 16, 2008. At her sentencing hearing, her daughter Kristin gave a victim's impact statement: "You've given up all rights as a mother, wife, daughter, friend and woman. You're a disgrace to this family – a pitiful excuse for a human. I pray you're continually haunted at night by the sight and sound of my father fighting for his last breathing moments on this earth. I hope you toss and turn and have horrible nightmares visualizing the horrific act of violence you have committed.".

For a period Schuster served her sentence at the Valley State Prison for Women in Chowchilla, California, however, as of 2022, she is in the California Institution for Women.

James Fagone is serving his sentence at the Calipatria State Prison in Calipatria, California. Fagone appealed his conviction, arguing that he acted under duress and fear of Larissa. However, the California Court of Appeal affirmed his conviction in 2009, noting that he admitted to purchasing the stun gun used in the kidnapping and had opportunities to flee. The court also rejected his "claim of right" defense, the argument that he believed he was lawfully helping Larissa recover her stolen property, ruling that the use of weapons negated any lawful intent. Fagone filed a federal habeas corpus petition in 2010, but voluntarily dismissed his own case in 2011, exhausting all of his legal appeals.

In February 2011, Larissa's murder conviction was affirmed by the Fifth District of the California Court of Appeal.

Schuster later petitioned for federal habeas corpus relief. Her initial petition was dismissed in 2016 for missing the one-year statute of limitations. However, in May 2017, the Ninth Circuit Court of Appeals reversed this dismissal, ruling that Schuster was entitled to 'equitable tolling' due to egregious professional misconduct by a fraudulent legal advocacy organization (FIA) that she had hired, which miscalculated her deadline and abandoned her. Once the case was reopened and reviewed on its merits, the U.S. District Court officially denied her petition in late 2019, rejecting her claims of Miranda rights violations, ineffective assistance of counsel, and her attempt to use the Battered Spouse Syndrome as a defense. The case was formally closed in September 2020.

The murder of Timothy Schuster was featured on Snapped and Dateline NBC in 2009, Deadly Women in 2011, Sins and Secrets in 2012, Deadly Wives in 2013, How (Not) to Kill Your Husband in 2014, It Takes A Killer in 2017, and ABC30's Evil in the Archives in 2024.
