= Central California Women's Facility =

Female prison in Chowchilla, California

Central California Women's Facility (CCWF)
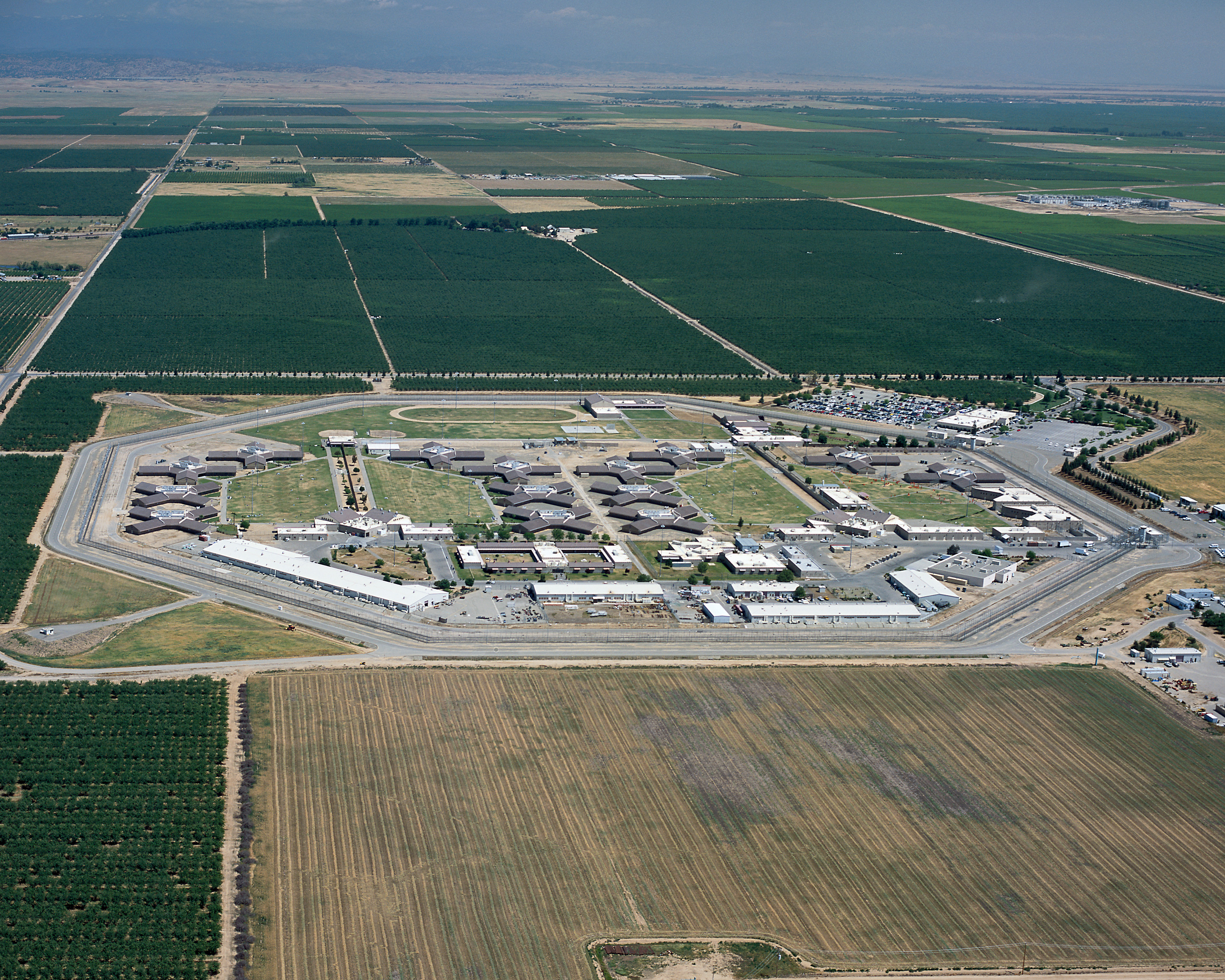
- Interactive map of Central California Women's Facility (CCWF)
- Location: Chowchilla, California; 37.093°N 120.153°W
- Status: Operational
- Security class: Minimum-maximum
- Capacity: 1,990
- Population: 2,279 (114.5% capacity) (January 31, 2023)
- Opened: October 1990
- Managed by: California Department of Corrections and Rehabilitation

Central California Women's Facility (CCWF) is an American women's California Department of Corrections and Rehabilitation state prison located in Chowchilla, California. It is across the road from Valley State Prison. CCWF is the second largest female correctional facility in the United States, and houses the only State of California death row for women.

== Facilities ==
Location of Chowchilla in Madera County, and Madera County in California

CCWF covers 640 acres (260 ha). As of Fiscal Year 2006/2007, CCWF had a total of 1,205 staff and an annual operating budget of US$138 million.

As of April 30, 2020, CCWF was incarcerating people at 131.7% of its design capacity, with 2,640 occupants.

CCWF holds prisoners at all security levels:

- Reception Center (RC) – provides short term housing to process, classify and evaluate incoming inmates

Level I through Level IV are all housed together inside a 32-room housing unit. There are 256 inmates of all levels housed together with two Correctional Officers. On the Reception Yard there are 276 inmates per housing unit of unclassified inmates supervised by two officers.

- Condemned (Cond) housing – holds inmates with death sentences

The prison provides inmate academic education, vocational training, counseling and specialized programs for the purpose of successful reintegration into society.

The Center for Restorative Justice (CRJW) Family Express program, provides weekly transportation for family members from major California cities to visit prisoners at the facility.

== History ==
The Madera County board of supervisors gave the prison its current name in 1989 "after months of discussion and disagreement". CCWF opened in October 1990, having cost $141 million to construct.

In 1996, the City of Chowchilla was given permission to perform a "non-contiguous annexation" of CCWF.

Starting in April 2007, CCWF received some inmates from California Rehabilitation Center after closure of the women's wing at that prison. The population at CCWF "swelled by 8 percent".

There have been controversies surrounding healthcare and health standards at the CCWF over the years. Including but not limited to the following events:

- In June 1991, an inmate died; some inmates "refused to report to their prison jobs" to protest the prison's medical care "which they said was linked to the death". Later, an autopsy was conducted to show that the inmate "died of acute inflammation of the pancreas," not "an overdose of the tranquilizer Haldol" as some inmates believed.
- Over 100 protesters outside the prison in January 1994 alleged that CCWF "failed to provide a medical specialist and educational programs to deal with HIV/AIDS-infected inmates," and that CCWF's healthcare providers "often ignore inmate ailments and provide little or no follow-up examinations".
- An April 1995 class action lawsuit against CCWF and California Institution for Women "allege[d] that inmates suffer terribly and in some cases die because of inadequate medical care". A 1997 settlement agreement led to two reports showing "improvements" in health care for female prisoners, but plaintiffs' lawyers claimed that "the changes deal[t] mostly with medical records, not actual care."
- From July to November 1996, a private laboratory billed CCWF $161,000 "for thousands of medical tests, including Pap smears to detect cervical cancer, HIV tests, biopsies and urinalyses" even though the tests had never been used on the inmates. At least six other prisons also used the laboratory. Although the State of California closed the laboratory in 1997, a 2000 newspaper investigation found that there was "little evidence of any attempt by the California Department of Corrections to retest inmates or notify them that their test results were faked".
- In 1999, an inmate with "hepatitis C and liver disease" died after being "prescribed anti-TB medications known to be toxic to patients with liver disease". A wrongful-death lawsuit based on the case was "settled for $225,000" in 2002.
- In the "month and a half" prior to December 20, 2000, seven CCWF inmates died. Of these, four "apparently succumbed to chronic terminal illnesses," but an advocacy group claimed that the deaths "were precipitated by inadequate care". The other three "died suddenly and unexpectedly," which led to autopsies being performed. As a result, the three causes of death were determined to be "heart problems and natural causes," "a severe asthma attack and chok[ing] on her vomit after a routine strip search," and "clogged arteries and an enlarged heart". Nevertheless, "relatives of the three women" and a physician from the University of California, San Francisco "who reviewed their deaths" held the opinion that "better health care could have saved their lives".
- A hospice program was started at CCWF in the summer of 2000, but by mid-2001 was "seldom" used. One possible explanation was a low amount of funding compared with the men's hospice at California Medical Facility; another possible explanation was CCWF's granting "compassionate releases to dying inmates who otherwise might enter the program".
- In December 2003, seven CCWF inmates sued seven physicians and "several nurses" for "malpractice, negligence and unprofessional conduct".
- In February 2007, the California Office of the Inspector General concluded "Numerous studies show that despite an annual cost of $36 million, the Department of Corrections and Rehabilitation’s in-prison substance abuse treatment programs have little or no impact on recidivism." The report specifically mentioned the "New Choice female felon program" at CCWF, for which "12-month recidivism rates... were lower for non-participants than for participants."

== Employees ==
As of 2007, of the prison guards, 31% were women. 19% of sergeants were women, and less than 1% of lieutenants are women.

== Notable inmates ==
=== Death row ===
After Governor Pete Wilson decreed in December 1991 that CCWF shall hold all female death row inmates in California, Maureen McDermott became the first death row inmate at CCWF. She was the first woman sentenced to death in a period of several decades, and at one period, she was the only person in the unit. Initially a set of nine cells in the 504 building, a two-story building for difficult to manage and maximum security prisoners, served as the women's death row.

The death row inmates' names (with years of sentencing) are:

- Rosie Alfaro (sentenced 1992)
- Socorro Caro (2002)
- Celeste Simone Carrington (1994)
- Cynthia Coffman (1989)
- Kerry Lyn Dalton (1995)
- Skylar Preciosa Deleon (2010)
- Veronica Gonzales (1998)
- Jessica Marie Hann (2014)
- Lorraine Hunter (2018)
- Cherie Lash-Rhoades (2018)
- Belinda Magana (2015)
- Valerie Dee Martin (2010)
- Maureen McDermott (1990)
- Michelle Lyn Michaud (2002)
- Tanya Nelson (2010)
- Angelina Rodriguez (2004)
- Brooke Rottiers (2010)
- Cathy Lynn Sarinana (2009)
- Janeen Marie Snyder (2006)
- Manling Tsang Williams (Chinese: 曾玫琳; Jyutping: cang4 mui4 lam4; pinyin: Zēng Méilín) (2011)

=== Current and former inmates ===
- Rebecca Grossman, to serve her sentence of 15 years to life for the 2020 vehicular murders and hit-and-run of Mark and Jacob Iskander in Westlake Village.
- Jeena Han, was sentenced to 26 years to life in prison for attempted murder and false imprisonment of her twin sister Sunny Han to assume her identity and leave the country. She was released on parole in May 2018.
- Nikki Charm, porn star, for auto theft and burglary. Sentenced for five years in 2002.
- Jennifer Gastelum, a San Diego mother convicted of sexual exploitation of her two daughters with estranged husband Jonathan Gastelum. Sentenced to 22 years plus 18.
- Helen L. Golay, whose crimes committed in 1999 and 2005 in Los Angeles County became known as Black Widow murders. She is serving life in prison without possibility of parole.
- Jennifer Lynn Henderson, aka Jennifer DeLeon, convicted in 2006, serving two consecutive sentences of life without parole for the murder of Thomas and Jackie Hawks, a retired couple killed as part of a conspiracy to steal their yacht and bank accounts.
- Marjorie Knoller was released from CCWF and sent to Ventura County on parole in January 2004. She had reportedly just served "about 16 months" at Valley State Prison for Women.
- Sara Kruzan is a victim of human trafficking and a convicted murderer. In 1994, at the age of 16, she was sentenced to life imprisonment without parole after being convicted of murdering her pimp; in January 2011, outgoing governor Arnold Schwarzenegger commuted her sentence to 25 years to life with the possibility of parole. In January 2013, her conviction was reduced to 2nd degree manslaughter and her sentence to 19 years, making her eligible for parole. A parole hearing was conducted June 12, 2013; she was found suitable for parole and released on October 31, 2013. She was also subsequently pardoned in July 2022
- Omaima Nelson, an Egyptian woman who castrated and murdered her husband, dismembered his body and cooked his body parts, allegedly consuming his ribs. She was later transferred at California Institution for Women.
- Ellie Nesler was first imprisoned at CCWF for a 10-year sentence beginning in January 1994. During her stay, she received treatment for breast cancer. She was released in October 1997 after a plea bargain. She was again at CCWF between 2002 and June 2006 to "serve a sentence for selling drugs."
- Catherine Kieu, convicted in 2013 for spousal abuse and false imprisonment, including mutilating her husband's genitals.
- Kristin Rossum, currently serving a life sentence in California for poisoning her husband Greg deVillers with fentanyl she stole from her job and attempting to pass off his death as a suicide, made famous from the crime show Snapped as well as other media.
- Judy Wong, former mayor and first Chinese-American councilmember from the City of Temple City, California. Pleaded no-contest to corruption charges and accepted a prison sentence for her role in a multimillion-dollar bribery scheme involving developers. Released from prison May 17, 2011.
- Dorothy Maraglino, one of three people convicted in the 2012 murder of Brittany Killgore.
- Nancy Garrido, who kidnapped Jaycee Dugard in 1991. She is serving 36 years to life imprisonment.
- Dana Sue Gray, convicted of killing three elderly women in 1994. Gray was sentenced on October 16, 1998, and is serving life without the possibility of parole.
- Nanette Ann Packard, convicted of ordering Eric Naposki to murder Bill McLaughlin.
- Larissa Schuster, sentenced to life in prison without parole for submerging her husband's body in hydrochloric acid.
- Melissa Huckaby, sentenced to life without parole for murdering 8 year old Sandra Cantu.
- Julia Rodriquez Diaz, first female inmate to receive 15 years parole denial under Proposition 9, also known as Marsy's Law. Convicted in July 1979 for the murder of 7-year-old boy, Javier Angel. Featured in a 2013 episode of Deadly Women entitled "Heartless Souls"
- Louise Turpin, sentenced to life with 25 years before parole along with her husband David for holding 12 of their 13 children captive, during which time they were abused, starved and tortured
- Suzan Carson, convicted serial killer serving 75 years to life for the murder of three people.
- Pearl Fernandez, sentenced to life without the possibility of parole for the torture and murder of her son Gabriel.
- Diane Downs, convicted of murdering one of her children and attempted murder of the other two, serving life plus 50 years.
- Tylar Witt, convicted in 2011 for the 2009 murder of her mother, Joanne Witt, and sentenced to 15 years to life. She was released in 2023.
- Susan Eubanks, convicted in 1999 for murdering her four sons. She then attempted suicide. Was originally sentenced to death but was granted clemency and re-sentenced to life in prison without the possibility of parole in October 2024.

=== Deceased ===
- Susan Atkins, an associate of Charles Manson, was transferred to CCWF on September 24, 2008, with a diagnosis of terminal brain cancer. She died at CCWF on September 24, 2009.
- Dorothea Puente "was convicted in 1993 on five counts of first-degree murder and sentenced to life in prison without parole" at CCWF. She died at CCWF in March 2011.
