= John Ewell =

American serial killer

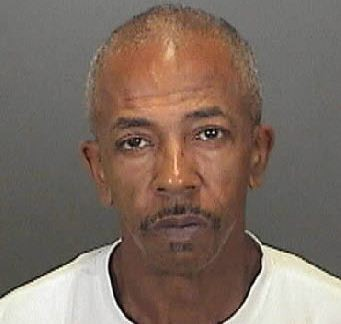
- Ewell's 2010 mugshot
- Born: John Wesley Ewell; 1957 or 1958 (age 68–69)
- Status: Incarcerated
- Conviction: First degree murder with special circumstances (4 counts)
- Penalty: 4 Life sentences without the possibility of parole

Details
- Victims: 4
- Span of crimes: September – October 2010
- Country: United States
- State: California
- Date apprehended: October 23, 2010
- Imprisoned at: Valley State Prison

John Wesley Ewell (born 1956/1957) is an American serial killer who murdered four people at their residences in Hawthorne, California, over the span of two months in 2010. Prior to the murders, he was an activist who opposed California's "3-strikes" law, and he even appeared in a 2006 episode of The Montel Williams Show.

== Early life ==
Not much is known about his childhood, but throughout his life, he had a lengthy criminal record. In 1985, Ewell was arrested for forcing a woman to withdraw money from an ATM at gunpoint, and was also separately arrested after forcing a man out of a parked truck, binding him, and stealing his wallet.

In 1989 he was convicted of robbery and burglary. In 1995, he was arrested and charged with check forgery. Under California's 3-strike law, he was made available for a possible 25-year to life sentence. However, under the agreement of a plea deal, he was sentenced to seven years in prison.

After his release, he found a job as a hairdresser and worked partially as a handyman. He also starting advocating in protest against the 3-strike law. In 2006, Ewell was one of several guests to appear in an episode of Montel Williams's talk show "The Montel Williams Show", where he indicated his fear of going to prison forever. In 2010, Ewell was arrested in Huntington Park after committing a burglary. He pleaded guilty to the crime. He remained free awaiting sentencing when he was again detained, this time for shoplifting. For that crime, he was released on $20,000 bail.

== Murders ==
Ewell committed his first murder on September 24, 2010, when he broke into the home of 80-year-old Hanna Morcos in Hawthrone. He bound Morcos' hands behind his back using a window cord, and subsequently began to beat him with his fists and a blunt object. The beating ultimately made Morcos suffer a fatal heart attack. Later that day in the afternoon, a family member entered his home and found Morcos' body face down.

Under a month later, on October 13, Ewell traveled two homes down from where he lived and broke into the home of 53-year-old Denise Roberts. Once again, Ewell bound Roberts' hands behind her back, gagged, and strangled her to death. He robbed the place, before once again leaving.

Nine days later, on October 21, Ewell, posing as a utility man, entered the home of Leamon Caroll Turnage and his wife Robyn, both 69 and 57, respectively, who had earlier returned from vacation in Florida. Ewell bound the couple one by one, strangled them to death before once again, robbing the house and taking jewelry. Their bodies were discovered by police officers doing a welfare check a few days later after they had failed to contact family members. While investigating the Turnage's deaths, police discovered a surveillance video of a man looting an ATM with Robyn's credit card.

On October 23, Ewell attempted to use the Tunage's ATM card outside a Shell service station in Gardena. He did not wear a mask and CCTV cams captured images of his face. He was arrested, and by the time of his capture, the four murders had attracted local media attention and fear had been widening among residents. His vehicle was also searched, and police uncovered a newspaper article covering the arrest of Lonnie David Franklin Jr. Franklin Jr. had been arrested in July 2010, in connection with the murders of ten people in South Los Angeles since 1984.

== Court proceedings ==
Ewell was to remain in jail until his preliminary hearing, which was continually postponed due to unknown circumstances. As evidence emerged, his lawyers stated that Ewell could have been in jail during some of the killings, however that argument was dismissed.

In January 2013, Ewell was charged with four counts of first-degree murder and four counts of robbery. He denied committing the crimes and pleaded not guilty. Due to an immediate grand jury indictment, the case was due to head to trial shortly after. Ewell faced a possible death sentence if the case were to go to trial and he was found guilty. In May 2019, Ewell, who up to that point denied being responsible for the murders, accepted a plea deal that allowed him to plead guilty to all four murders in exchange for the death penalty to be taken away. Thus, on July 18, he was sentenced to four consecutive life sentences without the possibility of parole. Ewell was transferred to Valley State Prison in August 2019 to serve his sentence.

== See also ==
- List of serial killers in the United States
