= Kerry Lyn Dalton =

American murderer (born 1960)

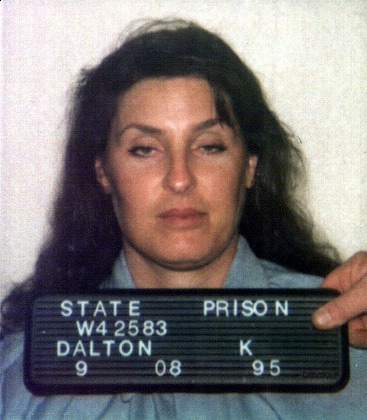
- Mug shot of Dalton
- Born: January 24, 1960 (age 66); Van Nuys, California, U.S.
- Status: Incarcerated at the Central California Women's Facility
- Convictions: First-degree murder with special circumstances Conspiracy to commit murder
- Penalty: Death

Kerry Lyn Dalton (born January 24, 1960) is a convicted murderer and is currently incarcerated at the Central California Women's Facility in Chowchilla, California. Dalton was originally sentenced to death, however, the Supreme Court of California vacated her death sentence in 2019.

== Arrest and investigation ==
Dalton, accused of torturing and murdering Irene ("Melanie") Louise May on June 26, 1988, at a mobile home park in Live Oak Springs, California, was arrested on May 14, 1992. Dalton and three others, Mark Lee Tompkins, Sheryl Ann Baker, and another man known only by the name "George," were alleged to have used various weapons to commit a torture-murder: a cast-iron frying pan, a knife, and a syringe filled with battery acid.

The night of the alleged murder, when a sheriff's deputy was called to the same mobile home residence on a burglary call, he reported no evidence of a burglary or any criminal activity other than the resident, JoAnn Fedor, was high on methamphetamine. He searched inside and outside the residence and noted in his report the resident was a "5150" police code for mentally incapable of comprehending reality. No weapons nor blood evidence was recovered; there was no physical evidence for the jury to consider. (trial transcripts: p. 2738–70, CR NO. 135002).

== Trial ==
On February 14, 1995, on the sixth day of Dalton's trial, the presiding judge, Thomas J. Whelan, made this statement: "I think the record is clear that no body has ever been found in this case. The record is equally clear that there is circumstantial evidence that there was a homicide. There's also conflicting circumstantial evidence that it may not be a homicide; in fact, she may still be alive ..." Whelan went on to say, "My reason for making these statements is to establish for the record that in my mind corpus is a legitimate issue in this case. It's not a ruse that - there is a legitimate issue before the jury as to whether or not there's - a corpus of homicide has been established". (trial transcripts: p. 3507, CR NO. 135002).

In response to a question from the prosecutor and an objection from the defense, the judge said, "Ladies and gentlemen, in the last question Mr. Dusek asked, he mentioned that the - Melanie May - in this case, is deceased. That's a fact for you to decide. It's inappropriate for him to put that in the question...whether or not Miss May is in fact deceased or not, because that's something for you to decide". (trial transcripts: p. 4661, CR NO. 135002)

The alleged confessions from Dalton in regards to the murder of May are solely based on Prosecutor's investigator Richard Cooksey repeating hearsay. There is no record of any confession coming directly from Dalton.

Dalton accused Prosecutor Jeff Dusek of willful misconduct. "The thing that makes me the most mad is that he is lying, and he knows he's lying," she said at the trial. The jury's foreman, John Castleman, said they based the verdict of death on "the type of murder it was," although there was no physical evidence to support the prosecution's story that there even was a murder.

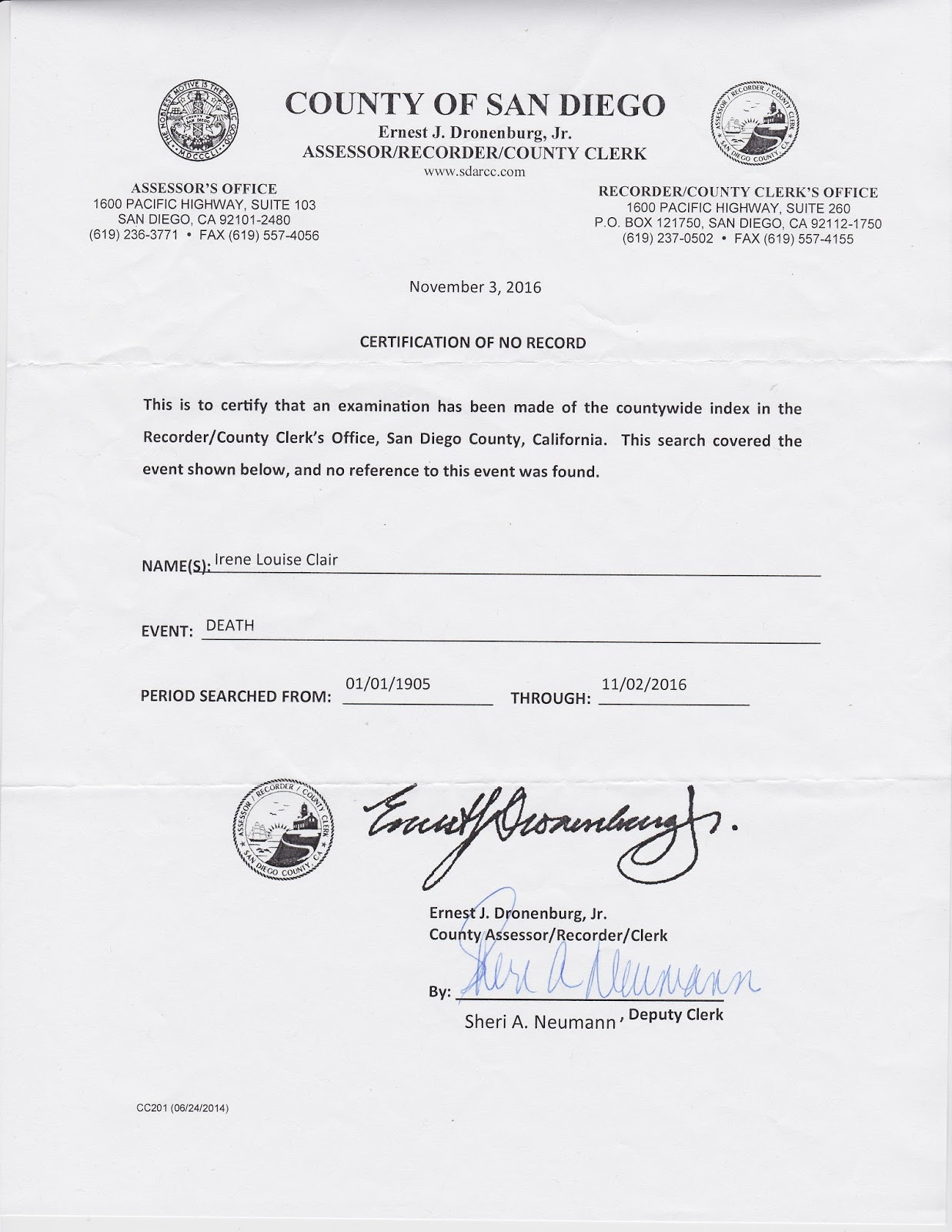
2016 - Certification of no record

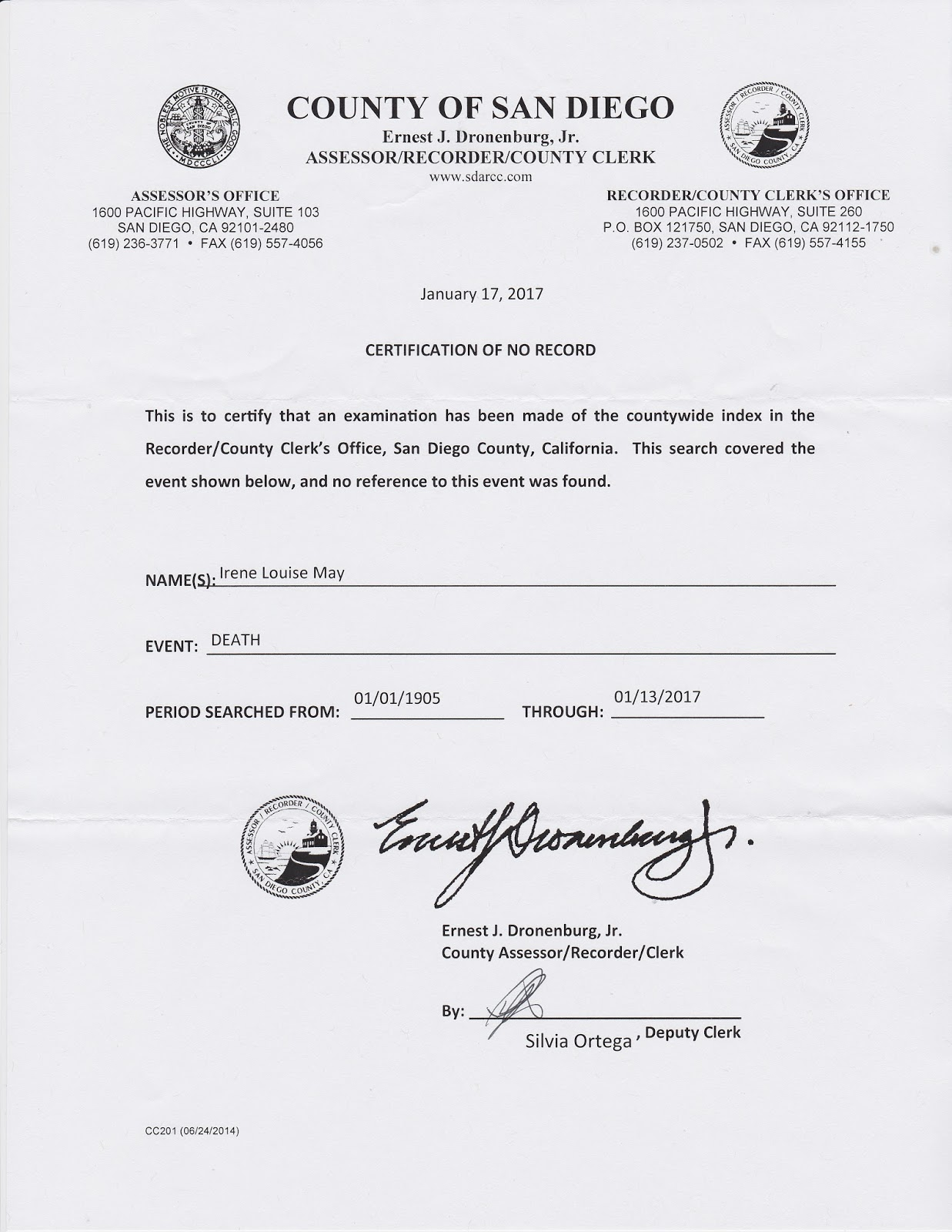
2017 - Certification of no record

== Depiction in media ==
Dalton's case was featured on the Discovery Channel series Deadly Women (Season 5, Episode 13, "Pleasure from Pain"), which first aired December 2, 2011. Her 1995 trial is also documented in a book, Cages, written and published by Dalton's sister in 2012.

== See also ==
- List of Deadly Women episodes
- List of death row inmates in the United States § California
- List of women on death row in the United States § California
