= Black Widow Murders =

Crimes in California, US

Helen Golay
- Born: 1931; Texas, U.S.
- Died: California Institution for Women, Chino, California, U.S.
- Occupation: Former landlord
- Years active: 1997–2005
- Status: Convicted
- Criminal charges: First-degree murder, conspiracy to commit murder, insurance fraud
- Penalty: Life sentence without parole
- Accomplice: Olga Rutterschmidt

Details
- Victims: Paul Vados, Kenneth McDavid
- Date: 1999, 2005
- Country: United States
- Locations: Hollywood, Los Angeles, California
- Target: Homeless men
- Killed: 2
- Weapon: Automobile (Hit-and-run)
- Date apprehended: 2006
- Imprisoned at: California Institution for Women

Notes
- Convicted alongside Olga Rutterschmidt for the Black Widow Murders

The Black Widow Murders is a colloquial name for a pair of murders committed by two pensioners in California, United States: on April 18, 2008, Helen Golay, 78, formerly of Santa Monica, California, and Olga Rutterschmidt, 75, formerly of Hollywood, California, were convicted of the murders of two vagrants—Paul Vados in 1999 and Kenneth McDavid in 2005. According to reports, Golay and Rutterschmidt staged Vados and McDavid's deaths to appear as hit and run incidents in order to collect on multimillion-dollar life insurance policies they had taken out on the men.

== The murders ==
=== Paul Vados ===
Seventy-three-year-old homeless man Paul Vados was found lying dead in an alley in Hollywood, California, near 307 North La Brea Avenue on November 8, 1999. Vados, who had emigrated from Hungary in 1956, appeared to be the victim of a hit-and-run.

Two years previously, in 1997, Golay and Rutterschmidt began applying for life insurance policies on Vados, listing themselves as the beneficiaries. After Vados's death, Golay and Rutterschmidt received benefits from eight different life insurance policies that had been taken out on him.

=== Kenneth McDavid ===
According to a surveillance video, fifty-year-old homeless man Kenneth McDavid was hit by a silver 1999 Mercury Sable station wagon on June 21, 2005. McDavid was originally from northern California and had attended Sacramento State University.

From November 2002 to March 2003, Golay and Rutterschmidt took out a total of thirteen policies on McDavid that totaled US$3.7 million (equivalent to $6.5 million in 2025). On the various insurance applications, Golay and Rutterschmidt were listed as McDavid's business partner, cousin or fiancée.

Before their arrest, Golay had received a total of $1.5 million (equivalent to $2.5 million in 2025) in insurance proceeds from McDavid's death, and Rutterschmidt a total of $0.7 million (equivalent to $1.1 million in 2025).

== Perpetrators ==
Olga Rutterschmidt was born in Hungary in 1933. She emigrated to the United States in 1957 and owned a coffee shop in Los Angeles with her husband. Having divorced, she moved to Hollywood in the 1970s.

Helen Golay was born in Texas in 1931. She lived in a $1.5 million home and also was a landlord, owning three further properties.

Rutterschmidt had been serving her sentence at Central California Women's Facility. Golay had been serving her sentence at California Institution for Women.

== The trial ==
The women pleaded not guilty to the murders and nine counts of fraud.

A third homeless man, Jimmy Covington, 48, testified at trial that he had been approached by Rutterschmidt. Covington asserted she took him to a Burger King restaurant for a meal, where she promised him shelter and assistance with obtaining welfare and other services for the destitute. He testified that he had moved out after a few days, due to growing suspicious when Golay and Rutterschmidt asked him to sign documents and demanded his date of birth, Social Security Number and other identifying information. By then, Golay and Rutterschmidt had already filled out one life insurance policy application for Covington.

The case was described, by Deputy District Attorney Shellie Samuels, who prosecuted it, as "like Arsenic and Old Lace, but it doesn't have Cary Grant."

The prosecution's case included secretly recorded conversations between Golay and Rutterschmidt when they were in jail. Rutterschmidt told Golay in one conversation "You did all these insurances extra. That's what raised the suspicion. You can't do that. Stupidity. You're going to go to jail, honey. They going to lock you up." Suspicion had in fact been raised when a detective happened to overhear a colleague discussing a case whose features closely resembled that of another one.

Both Golay and Rutterschmidt were convicted in Los Angeles, California, in April 2008, for conspiracy to murder Vados and McDavid, and for the first-degree murder of Vados. Golay was convicted of the first-degree murder of McDavid. Convictions on the several counts spanned a week, because one juror had to go on a trip and be replaced by an alternate. The original jury reached a deadlock over the final two counts against Rutterschmidt, but after the alternate juror was introduced the trial judge ordered the jury to recommence deliberations. Both women were sentenced to consecutive life terms in California state prison, without possibility of parole.

Appeals of the convictions and sentences were denied and judgments upheld, at first on August 18, 2009, by the Court of Appeals, Second District, Division 5, State of California, and ultimately by the California Supreme Court on October 28, 2012.

== In media ==
On February 10, 2010, "The Black Widow Murders" were featured on an episode of American Greed on CNBC. On September 10, 2009, the case was profiled on an episode of Deadly Women entitled "Behind the Mask". Also in 2009, the series Wicked Attraction featured an episode named "Golden Years" in its second season detailing the history and criminal acts of the two. On November 13, 2013, Elder Skelter featured a story about Ken McDavid's death. The episode was called "Death, Lies and Security Tape". On June 26, 2024, the case was featured in an episode of Accident, Suicide or Murder entitled "Let Us Prey".

On July 21, 2008, The Closer aired the episode "Speed Bump" loosely based on the Black Widow Murders, with a few changed details, such as paroled felons as the victims instead of homeless men. Jenny O'Hara and Wendy Phillips guest-starred as the greedy villains.

On December 16, 2009, CSI: NY aired the episode "Second Chances" which mirrors a great deal of the Black Widow Murders, but with a younger cast, consisting of Kim Kardashian and Vanessa Minnillo as the money-hungry black widows.

On November 17, 2021, Dateline NBC released a 6 part Podcast titled "The Thing about Helen and Olga" presented and narrated by Keith Morrison.

== See also ==
- List of homicides in California
