= Tracy Walker (serial killer) =

American serial killer (born 1964)

- Undated mugshot of Walker
- Born: 1964 (age 61–62); Mississippi, U.S.
- Other name: "Solo"
- Convictions: 1993: Voluntary manslaughter 2021: Murder x3 Illegal possession of a firearm by a felon
- Penalty: 1993: 16 years imprisonment 2021: 110 years to life

Details
- Victims: 4
- Span of crimes: 1991–2021
- Country: United States
- State: California
- Date apprehended: February 11, 2021
- Imprisoned at: Valley State Prison

Tracy Walker (born 1964) is an American serial killer who murdered three homeless people in Rancho Dominguez, California, from 2020 to 2021. Having previously been incarcerated for a 1991 voluntary manslaughter conviction, Walker later pleaded guilty to the murders and was sentenced to life imprisonment.

== Early life ==
Walker was born in 1964 in Mississippi, growing up in an impoverished household. His mother frequently cohabited with various men and gave birth to seven other boys from different fathers. Unable to afford tuition, Walker dropped out of school in the late 1970s and began working in manual labor, often changing jobs.

In 1985, he left his home state and moved to Los Angeles, where he found a job, got married, and settled in his own house. At that time, he was well regarded by friends and neighbors, had no history of drug or alcohol abuse, and had never been convicted of any crimes.

== Voluntary manslaughter ==
By 1991, Walker was working as a security guard at a bus depot on 77th Street when, in the early morning hours of December 7, he got into a dispute with a fellow guard, which resulted in him shooting and killing the 34-year-old man with a revolver, a crime witnessed by multiple bystanders. Immediately after committing the killing, Walker attempted to flee in a school bus, managing to drive several blocks away from the crime scene, but was soon stopped by police officers on San Pedro Street. Refusing to comply with their demands, Walker attempted to open fire on them, but officers drew their weapons and fired on him, striking him seven times. Walker was rushed to the Martin Luther King Jr. Outpatient Center for treatment, where, despite the severity of his injuries, he eventually recovered and was put on trial in 1993. During the investigation into the crime, his defense attorney was able to have the charges reclassified from first-degree murder to voluntary manslaughter. Walker eventually pleaded guilty to this charge and was sentenced to 16 years imprisonment.

While serving his sentence, Walker's mental state deteriorated dramatically. He was diagnosed with a variety of conditions over the years, including schizophrenia and PTSD, brought on by the 1991 shootout. In the late 1990s, he was declared mentally unstable and transferred to a mental institution, where he was treated for several months. In 2001, Walker's condition improved; as a result, he was declared to no longer be a danger to the community and released.

=== Vagrancy ===
Soon after his release, he returned to Los Angeles, where he lived as a vagrant for the next two decades. During this period, he changed residences frequently, slept in homeless shelters or on the streets, and was forced to work in manual labor due to his lack of education. At different times, he is known to have worked as a cleaner, security guard, or laborer. He had no relations with his relatives or ex-wife, who divorced him in the mid-1990s after his conviction and moved out of state.

As he spent a lot of time among fellow vagrants, Walker often got into conflicts, as a result of which he carried a knife with him at all times. In 2011, he was arrested on a charge of unlawful possession of edged weaponry, to which he pleaded guilty and was placed on three years probation. During the mid-2010s, Walker lived in the notorious Skid Row neighborhood, known for housing some of the biggest homeless populations in the country.

In the late 2010s, Walker moved to an isolated section of land near the Compton Creek, where he soon gained a reputation as a loner who preferred not to be disturbed by others. Soon after the move, he began committing murders.

== Murders ==
=== Patricia Loeza ===
Walker's first known victim was 26-year-old Patricia Loeza, who was stabbed to death eight times in June 2020, with her body being found on June 7 on South Susanna Road. The youngest of four siblings, Loeza was raised in South Los Angeles after her father was deported to Mexico in 2003. As a high school student, she began abusing drugs, ran away from home, and began to live as a vagrant. During this period, she lived with a group of fellow homeless people on the streets of Los Angeles, gave birth to a son from an unknown father, and was arrested several times, spending time in the county jail. She had no contact with family members between 2016 and 2019.

While investigating the Loeza murder, law enforcement found two receipts and a Minute Maid carton near her body. They determined that the receipts originated from a Numero Uno Market store in Compton, while the juice was from a Vons in Long Beach. While reviewing surveillance footage from the Vons store, they noticed Tracy Walker buying the juice with an EBT card, after which they interviewed homeless people living near where the body of the murdered woman was found. They identified the man as a vagrant they knew by the nickname "Solo," whom detectives quickly established to be Walker, who was detained and questioned. He refused to admit guilt and was eventually released, as investigators had no evidence to charge him with anything at the time, despite the fact that a search of his tent uncovered several knives.

=== Kenneth Jones ===
On January 15, 2021, Walker committed his second murder. The victim was 26-year-old Kenneth Edward Jones, who, like Walker, was homeless and whom Walker beat to death on South Santa Fe Avenue, inflicting severe injuries to his head. Jones was born into a dysfunctional family in San Diego and was placed in foster care at age 8 due to physical abuse he suffered at the hands of his mother and stepfather. Two years later, he was adopted by his aunt, Keisha Grier, who lived in Compton. As a teenager, he attended a drawing and animation training program at Fox Film in Century City, dreaming of working as an animator for a Hollywood studio. However, like Loeza, Jones developed a drug addiction in high school and eventually had to live as a vagrant. Beginning in the mid-2010s, he spent months a year living with homeless people on the street, in a house owned by the church, or at the homes of various relatives. According to testimony from Compton police and a number of acquaintances, Jones made a living off shoplifting and stealing bicycles, which he then sold on the streets. In 2019, his girlfriend, Elsa Jimenez, gave birth to a son, who was soon placed in foster care.

=== Cesar Mazariegos ===
One month after the Jones murder, on February 9, Walker committed his third murder. The victim was 30-year-old Cesar Mazariegos, a member of the East Side Longos gang who had been released from prison in March 2020 and had spent the last months of his life on the streets, friends' houses, and motels while attempting to find work. According to his mother, Mazariegos had found work loading and unloading retail goods at a warehouse on Del Amo Boulevard shortly before his death, where his body would later be found at a nearby dirt embankment. Mazariegos' body was found covered with dried parts of tumbleweed, a piece of carpet, and a tarp tent.

While investigating his murder, the Los Angeles County detectives questioned Walker about his potential involvement in this case. He denied any responsibility during questioning, alleging that Mazariegos had been killed by members of the East Side Longos, who had thrown a party the night before where they had consumed a large quantity of methamphetamines.

== Arrest and confessions ==
A few days after the murder of Cesar Mazariegos, investigators determined that Walker had rented a storage unit from a firm in a building that was located near where his tent was set up. While reviewing video footage from surveillance cameras mounted on nearby buildings, they noticed Walker moving a heavy, oddly-shaped object in a furniture dolly into the nearby woods. Minutes later, Walker walked back to his tent, packed it up along with several pieces of dried tumbleweed, and then went back to the woods. The surveillance footage served as the basis for a search warrant for Walker's tent and the storage unit he rented. During the search, police found several bicycles, dollies, eight bolt cutters, soiled clothing, six cellphones, a safety deposit box key, a bandana, a black hat with the words "Long Beach" inscribed on it, a book about Malcolm X with handwritten writing, an Amazon tablet, about 50 knives, and a copy of the California Penal Code that had Section 187—the code for murder—highlighted. On February 11, 2021, Walker was finally arrested, but initially continued to deny that he had anything to do with the murders.

Upon learning that the officers had discovered what was in the storage unit, Walker made a plea deal with the District Attorney's Office. In exchange for them dropping the death penalty, he would explain what happened and how he committed the murders. In his confessions, Walker alleged that Loeza, whom he supposedly mistook for a male gang member, broke into his tent and stole several items while he was absent, but when he came back and caught her stealing, he decided to teach her a lesson and subsequently stabbed her to death.

In regards to the Jones murder, Walker claimed that he killed the man after he caught him using a bolt cutter to cut the wire on his bicycle lock in an attempt to steal it. Walker said that before going to bed, he tied the bicycle to his tent so he could feel even the slightest of movements, and after noticing Jones was attempting to run away with his bicycle, the two engaged in a scuffle in which Walker stabbed Jones in the chest and tried to break his neck. During the struggle, Jones supposedly bit him on the left hand, after which Walker used the bolt cutter to bludgeon him to death. He claimed that he threw the knife into some nearby bushes and hid the bolt cutter in the storage room.

The final murder, that of Mazariegos, Walker claimed to have committed in self-defense, supposedly on the grounds that the victim had attempted to rob him at gunpoint with a TEC-9. Walker claimed that he noticed by the way the man was holding the gun that he was unfamiliar with it, and using his advantage of being 6'1" and weighing 360 pounds, he rushed at Mazariegos, took the gun, and then beat him to death. His testimony was questioned, but during further questioning, he partially confirmed it with some evidence. To do so, he pointed out where he had buried the gun, with detectives finding a gun matching the one described by Walker at the exact spot. Once examined, it was found that Mazariegos' fingerprints were on it.

As six cellphones and several IDs in other people's names were found among Walker's belongings, it was initially believed that he may have committed more murders, despite him insisting that he had only committed three. In the following months, a number of forensic tests were conducted in an attempt to locate the owners of the cellphones, but this proved unsuccessful as the devices were either too old or too badly damaged. On the other hand, a check of the IDs showed that all the owners were still alive. As a result, it was assumed that Walker likely had not committed any other killings besides the ones he had already been connected to. It was established that some of the stolen items belonged to his murder victims, which prosecutors presented as trophies that he had taken from "battle" and "warfare."

== Trial and imprisonment ==
Walker's trial began in the fall of 2021. On September 16, he pleaded guilty to all charges, and on October 18, he was sentenced to life imprisonment with the possibility of parole after serving 110 years in prison.

== See also ==
- List of serial killers in the United States
- List of serial killers active in the 2020s
