= Death of Diane Whipple =

American lacrosse player and coach (1967–2001)

Diane Whipple
- Whipple's photo in the San Francisco Chronicle during her case
- Born: Diane Alexis Whipple; January 31, 1967; Princeton, New Jersey, U.S.
- Died: January 26, 2001 (aged 33); San Francisco, California, U.S.
- Cause of death: Fatal dog attack
- Employer: Saint Mary's College of California
- Known for: Media coverage about her death
- Title: Lacrosse coach

Diane Alexis Whipple (January 31, 1967 – January 26, 2001) was an American lacrosse player and college coach. She was killed in a dog attack in San Francisco on January 26, 2001. The dogs involved were two Presa Canarios belonging to Paul Schneider, a high-ranking member of the Aryan Brotherhood serving three life sentences in state prison. The dogs were looked after by Schneider's attorneys, Robert Noel and Marjorie Knoller, a married couple that lived in the same apartment building as Whipple. After the fatal attack, the state brought criminal charges against the attorneys. Noel, who was not present during the attack, was convicted of manslaughter. Knoller, who was present, was charged with implied-malice second-degree murder and convicted by the jury. Knoller's murder conviction, an unusual result for an unintended dog attack, was rejected by the trial judge but ultimately upheld. The case clarified the meaning of implied-malice murder.

== Early life of Diane Whipple ==
Whipple was born in Princeton, New Jersey. She grew up and attended high school in Manhasset, New York, on Long Island. She was raised primarily by her grandparents, and was a gifted athlete from a young age. She became a two-time All-American lacrosse player in high school, and later played at the university level at Penn State. She was twice a member of the U.S. Women's Lacrosse World Cup team.

Whipple later moved to San Francisco and tried to qualify for the 800 meters running event in track and field for the U.S. 1996 Olympics team, but she did not qualify and did not compete in the formal Olympic team trials. She became the lacrosse coach at Saint Mary's College of California in Moraga, California.

At the time of her death, Whipple lived in San Francisco's Pacific Heights with her domestic partner of six years, Sharon Smith.

== Background of the dogs ==
Two Pelican Bay State Prison inmates, Paul 'Cornfed' Schneider and Dale Bretches, both members of the Aryan Brotherhood prison gang, were attempting to start an illegal Presa Canario dog-fighting business from prison. They initially asked acquaintances Janet Coumbs and Hard Times Kennel owner/breeder James Kolber of Akron, Ohio, to raise the dogs during their incarceration. Against Kolber's advice, Coumbs chained the dogs in a remote corner of the farm, which caused them to become even more aggressive.

After Coumbs fell out of favor with Schneider, attorneys Marjorie Fran Knoller (born June 20, 1955) and Robert Edward Noel (June 22, 1941 – June 22, 2018) agreed to take possession of the dogs. They had become acquainted with Schneider while doing legal work for prisoners, and had adopted Schneider (then age 38) as their legal son a few days before the mauling. By January 2001, the male dog, named Bane, weighed 140 pounds (64 kg); the female dog, Hera, close to 100 pounds (45 kg).

=== Knoller and Noel ===
Knoller attended Brooklyn College, and received her J.D. degree from McGeorge School of Law in Sacramento, California. Noel graduated from the University of Baltimore Law School in 1967.

Noel and Knoller married in 1989. Starting in the mid-1990s, they ran their law office out of a converted closet in their Pacific Heights apartment in San Francisco, next door to Whipple.

== Attack ==
On January 26, 2001, while returning home with bags of groceries, Whipple was attacked by the two dogs in the hallway of her apartment building. Knoller was taking the dogs out of their apartment at the same time Whipple returned. The dogs escaped her control and attacked Whipple.

Just prior to the attack, Knoller was taking the dogs up to the roof; Bane, and possibly Hera, whose role in the mauling has never been firmly established, attacked Whipple in the hallway. Whipple suffered a total of 77 wounds to every part of her body except her scalp and bottoms of her feet. Another neighbor called 911 after hearing Whipple's screams. Whipple died hours later at San Francisco General Hospital from "loss of blood from multiple traumatic injuries (dog bite wounds)".

Bane was euthanized immediately after the attack; Hera was seized and later euthanized in January 2002.

Whipple's memorial service at St. Mary's College, held on February 1, 2001, was attended by more than 400 people.

== Legal proceedings against Knoller and Noel ==
In March 2001, a grand jury indicted Knoller and Noel. Knoller was indicted for second-degree murder and involuntary manslaughter, Noel was indicted for involuntary manslaughter, and "both also face[d] felony charges of keeping a mischievous dog".

The trial by jury, which began in January 2002, "was moved to Los Angeles because of extensive publicity in the Bay Area."

At trial, Knoller argued that she had attempted to shield Whipple with her body during the attack, which the prosecution disputed as she had suffered no injuries aside from minor bruising to her hands. However, witnesses testified that Knoller and Noel had repeatedly refused to control the dogs; a professional dog walker testified that, after she told Noel to muzzle his dogs, he told her to "shut up" and called her offensive names. An acquaintance of Noel's testified that Noel did not apologize after Hera bit him a year before the fatal attack. Many other neighbours testified about the dog's long history of uncontrollable and dangerous behavior and Noel and Knoller's indifference towards it, refusing suggestions that they get the dogs trained or fit them with a choke collar. Knoller also admitted that she did not call 911 to get help for Whipple after the attack.

Ultimately, the jury found both Noel and Knoller guilty of involuntary manslaughter and owning a mischievous animal that caused the death of a human being, and found Knoller guilty of second-degree murder. Their convictions were based on the argument that they knew the dogs were aggressive towards other people and that they did not take sufficient precautions, and, in Knoller's case, that she had allowed the dogs to maul Whipple to death without trying to save her. Whether they had actually trained the dogs to attack and fight remained unclear.

Although the jury found Knoller guilty of second-degree murder, trial judge James Warren granted Knoller a new trial on the second-degree murder conviction; the judge believed the appropriate standard for implied malice murder required that Knoller knew taking the dog into the hall involved a high probability of death. Although the judge granted a new trial for the second-degree murder charge, he sentenced Knoller to four years in prison for the lesser-included involuntary manslaughter on July 15, 2002. The state appealed the judge's action and sought to reinstate the second-degree murder conviction.

After Knoller's and Noel's convictions in 2002, the State Bar of California suspended their law licenses. Knoller resigned from the bar in January 2007; Noel was disbarred in February. On September 14, 2003, Noel was released from prison.

By 2004, both Knoller and Noel had served their terms for the manslaughter convictions, and Knoller was out on bail while her second-degree murder conviction was under appeal.

In May 2005, the state appellate court reversed the judge's grant of new second-degree murder trial for Knoller. The appellate court ruled that implied malice murder did not require knowledge of a high probability of death but rather just a conscious disregard of serious bodily injury. The appellate court returned the case to the lower court to reconsider Knoller's motion for a new trial using the serious bodily injury standard for implied malice murder.

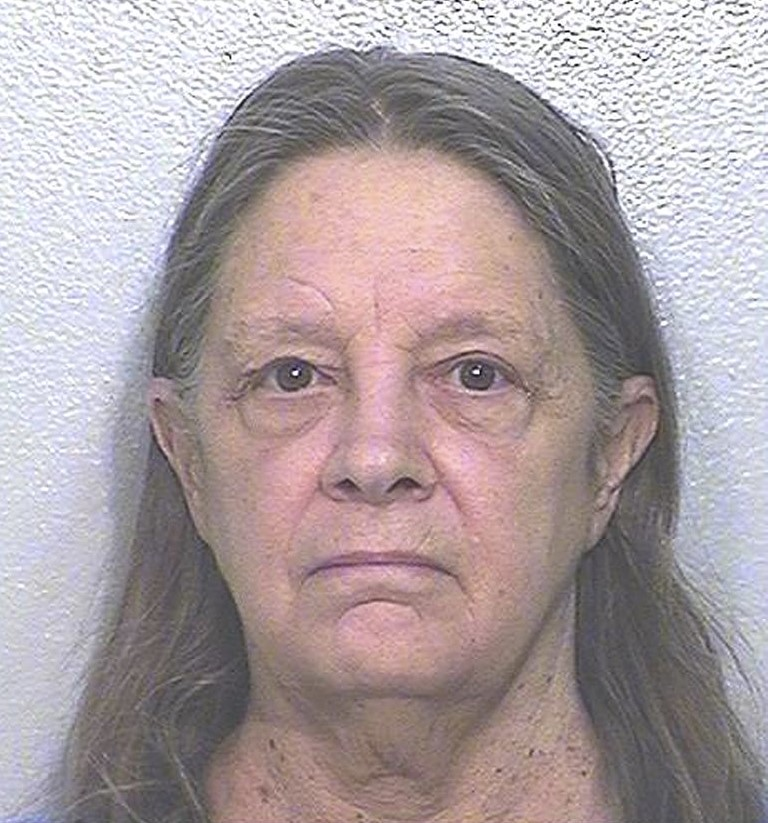
Marjorie Knoller in 2018

Knoller appealed the appellate court decision to the Supreme Court of California. On June 1, 2007, the California Supreme Court rejected the Court of Appeal's decision and ruled that implied malice murder required proof that a defendant acted with "conscious disregard" of the danger to human life. The California Supreme Court held that the trial court's standard for implied malice murder (which required a high probability of death) was too strict and the appellate court's standard (which required only serious bodily injury rather than a danger to human life) was too broad. The court remanded the case to the trial court to reconsider whether to allow the second-degree murder conviction to stand in light of this new reasoning. The San Francisco Superior Court reinstated the conviction for second-degree murder, and on September 22, 2008, the court sentenced Knoller to 15 years to life.

Knoller then appealed the trial court's actions. On August 23, 2010, the First District Court of Appeal unanimously upheld Knoller's conviction, finding that she acted with a conscious disregard for human life when the dogs under her care escaped and killed Whipple. The California Supreme Court declined to hear her appeal of that decision. Knoller is currently serving her sentence at Central California Women's Facility in Chowchilla.

In November 2015, Knoller petitioned the United States Court of Appeals for the Ninth Circuit to overturn her second-degree murder conviction. In February 2016, the Ninth Circuit upheld Knoller's second-degree murder conviction.

On February 7, 2019, California commissioners denied Knoller's first application for parole. Her December 2021 parole hearing was first postponed until August 29, 2022, then again until February 15, 2023. Her parole was denied. The two member panel cited her prison record and stated she would be a danger to society if released. On February 12, 2026, a two member panel of the Board of Parole Hearings denied Knoller's parole, once again on grounds that if released she would still be a danger to society and cited her prison record that included two disciplinary actions. She will be eligible for parole in 2029, when she will be 74 years of age.

Whipple's partner, Sharon Smith, also succeeded in suing Knoller and Noel for $1.5 million in damages. The civil case was notable in that the San Francisco Superior Court ruled in July 2001 that Smith was entitled to bring suit as Whipple's domestic partner under the Equal Protection Clause, against the defense's argument that a same-sex unmarried partner did not have standing. She donated some of the money to Saint Mary's College of California to fund the women's lacrosse team.

== Later life of Robert Noel ==
Noel lived in relative obscurity following his release from prison, working for a time as a baker in Fairfield, California. By 2016, increasing health problems led to his living out of a van for some time before he relocated to the San Diego area.

Noel died of heart failure in a La Jolla nursing home on June 22, 2018, the day of his 77th birthday. In her 2023 parole hearing, Knoller stated that she did not know about Noel's death until three months after it happened.

== See also ==
- Fatal dog attacks in the United States
- Death of Elisa Pilarski
