= Han twins murder plot =

1996 criminal case in the United States

Jeena Han
- Born: April 30, 1974 (age 52); Korea
- Relatives: Sunny Han (twin sister)
- Conviction: Guilty
- Criminal charges: Conspiracy to commit murder First-degree burglary False imprisonment by violence (2 counts); Second-degree burglary Possession of firearm by a convicted felon
- Penalty: Life imprisonment with the possibility of parole after 26 years

Sunny Han
- Born: April 30, 1974 (age 52); Korea
- Occupation: Lawyer
- Relatives: Jeena Han (twin sister)

The Han twins murder plot was a case of attempted murder of Sunny Han by her identical twin sister Jeena "Jeen" Han, occurring on November 6, 1996, in Irvine, California. Both are Korean-born American citizens.

Jeena Han recruited two teenage youths to capture her sister at home, but the plot went awry and the two were quickly taken into custody by local police. The jury reached their verdict as to each defendant on November 20, 1997, after ten hours' deliberation. Jeena Han was convicted of all charges including one count of conspiracy to commit murder, two counts of burglary (one in the first and another in the second degree), two counts of false imprisonment, and one count of a convicted felon in possession of a firearm. The jury also found that Jeena Han was armed with a firearm during the commission of each offense.

Jeena Han was imprisoned at the Central California Women's Facility in Chowchilla, California, in 1998 with a sentence of 26 years to life in prison. She was given an additional year because the jury found the firearm enhancement to be true. Twenty years later, in May 2018, she was granted parole by California's Board of Parole. Jeena received support from Sunny for parole.

== Aftermath ==
In 1999, the case was featured in the book Evil Twins by John Glatt.

In November 1999, an American Justice documentary titled "Sister Against Sister: The Twin Murder Plot" aired on A&E, covering the sensational details of the case. The program was hosted by Bill Kurtis.

In 2001, the case was profiled on The Investigators under the title "Evil Twin".

In 2005, Snapped, a series about true crime on the Oxygen Network, ran an episode about Jeen's plot to kill her twin sister and take over her life.

In 2012, this story became the focus of the pilot episode of the Investigation Discovery show, "Evil Twins".

In 2024, the case was featured in Stephanie Soo's podcast Rotten Mango on Spotify, on June 2, 2024, and is titled "#363: Korean "Evil Twin" Tried to Kill "Perfect" Sister to Take Over Her Identity."
