= California Institution for Women =

Women's prison in Chino, California

California Institution for Women (CIW)
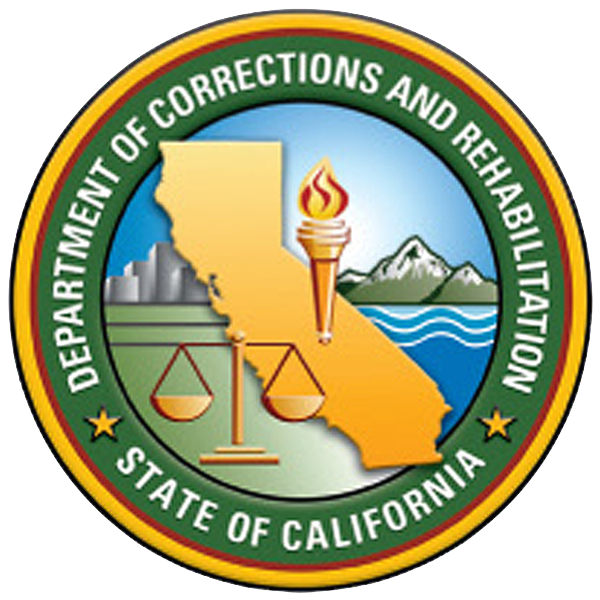
- Aerial View
- Interactive map of California Institution for Women (CIW)
- Location: Chino, California; 33.950°N 117.635°W
- Status: Operational
- Security class: Minimum to medium
- Capacity: 1,281
- Population: 983 (76.7% capacity) (January 31, 2023)
- Opened: 1952
- Managed by: California Department of Corrections and Rehabilitation
- Warden: Dirk Williams

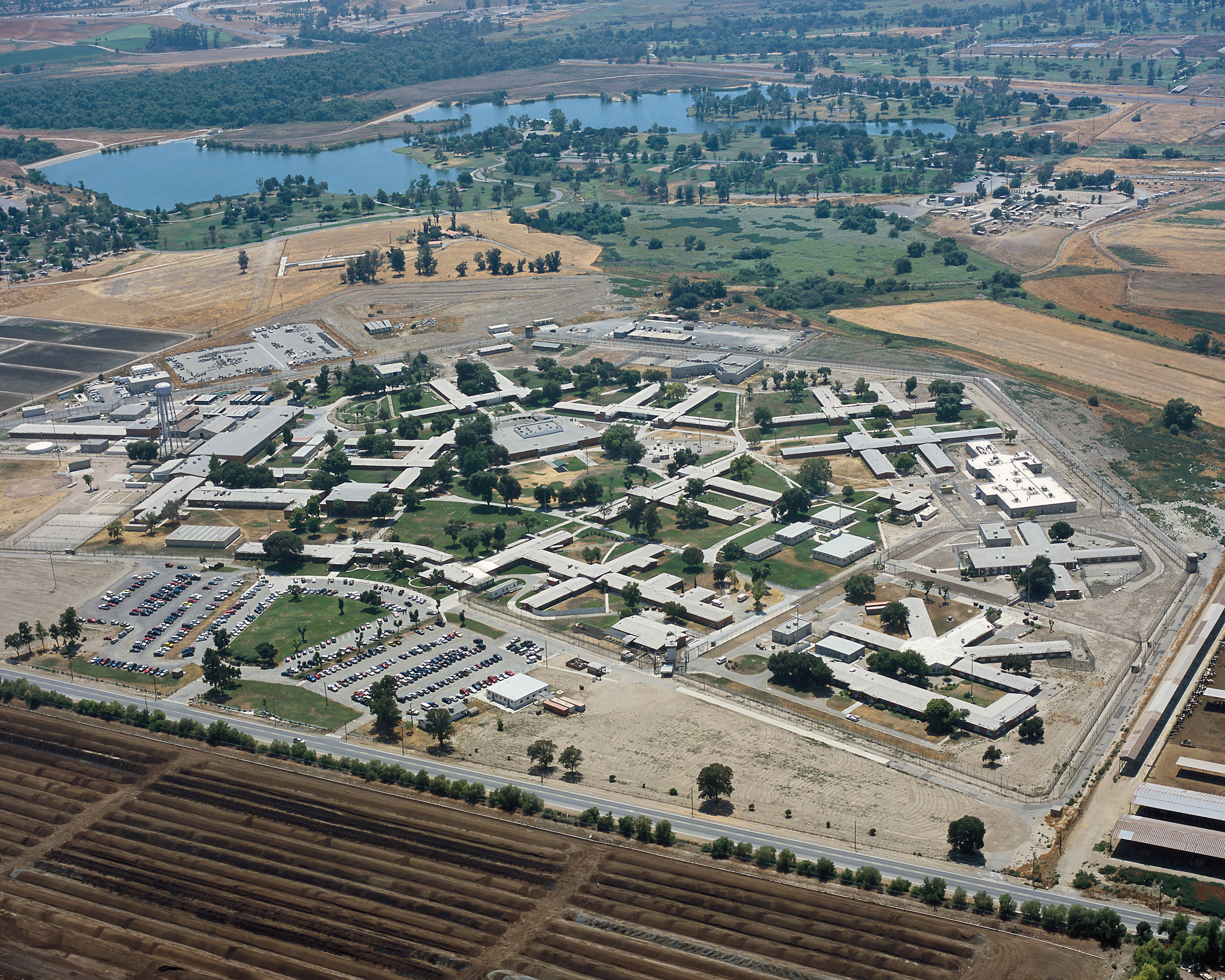
Aerial view

California Institution for Women (CIW) is an American women's state prison located in the city of Chino, San Bernardino County, California, east of Los Angeles, although the mailing address states "Corona", which is in Riverside County, California.

== Facilities ==
Although the official California Department of Corrections and Rehabilitation documents give a "Corona, California" mailing address for CIW in Riverside County, the prison has been physically located in the city of Chino since 2003 following an annexation of land in previously-unincorporated San Bernardino County.

CIW has 120 acres (49 ha). Its facilities include Level I ("Open dormitories without a secure perimeter") housing, Level II ("Open dormitories with secure perimeter fences and armed coverage") housing, and Level III ("Individual cells, fenced perimeters and armed coverage") housing. In addition, a Reception Center "provides short term housing to process, classify and evaluate incoming inmates."

As of Fiscal Year 2008/2009, CIW had 977 staff and an annual budget of $75 million Institutional and $2.6 million Education. As of October 31, 2013, it had a design capacity of 1,398 but a total institution population of 2,155, for an occupancy rate of 154.1 percent.

As of April 30, 2020, CIW was incarcerating people at 111.1% of its design capacity, with 1,553 occupants.

CIW is located east of Downtown Los Angeles; it takes about one hour to travel to the prison from central Los Angeles.

== History ==
The original California Institution for Women was dedicated in Tehachapi in 1932; however, after the 1952 Kern County earthquake, the female inmates were transferred to the just-opened CIW in Chino, and the Tehachapi facility was rebuilt as the male-only California Correctional Institution. CIW was originally called "California Institution for Women at Corona," but "Corona residents objected to the use of their city in the prison's name and it was changed March 1, 1962, to Frontera, a feminine derivative of the word frontier, symbolic for a new beginning." It housed the location of the death row for women in the state. CIW was the only women's prison in California until 1987, when the Northern California Women's Facility opened.

In the early years of CIW, convicted women wore Sunday dresses while walking and working at the campus-like setting until the 1980s when three towers were added with officers atop armed with shotguns. Among other programs for inmates at CIW is "Voices from Within" in which inmates read books on tapes for "high school students in remedial classes," "college students with reading disabilities," and the blind.

In 2007, the state of California proposed building 45 new units for mentally ill inmates at CIW and 975 at the nearby California Institution for Men; local officials opposed such plans.

From 2006 to 2013 one woman at CIW committed suicide. From January 1, 2013 to July 2016 six women committed suicide at CIW, and there had been an increase in suicide attempts.

== Notable inmates at CIW ==
- Renee Alway, a former inmate, is a noted American model and a former contestant of America's Next Top Model and Modelville runner-up. She was sentenced to a 12-year sentence for four felony burglary counts and one count each of vehicular theft and being a felon in possession of a firearm, and was released in 2018 after serving 5 years. She was arrested again in 2019 for domestic violence.
- Betty Broderick, a former inmate, was a San Diego socialite who was convicted of the 1989 murder of her ex-husband, Dan Broderick, and his new wife, Linda Kolkena Broderick. She was convicted in 1991 and sentenced to 32-years-to-life in prison. She was not granted parole at hearings in 2010 and 2017 due to a "lack of remorse", "refusal to apologize", and "denial of any wrongdoing." She would not have been eligible for a parole hearing again until 2032, but died on May 8, 2026 at a hospital in San Bernardino.
- Julia Rodriquez Diaz, first female inmate to receive 15 years parole denial under Proposition 9 (Marsy's Law) – Convicted in July 1979 of the murder of seven-year-old boy Javier Angel. Story told in September 2013 on Investigation Discovery's Deadly Women "Heartless Souls" (Was moved to California Institution for Women (CIW) in 2014.)
- Barbara Graham, murderer, executed at San Quentin State Prison on June 3, 1955. Subject of the 1958 film I Want to Live!.
- Rebecca Grossman, socialite. Convicted in February 2024 of the murder of brothers Mark and Jacob Iskander, ages 11 and 8 years old, in a 2020 Westlake Village hit-and-run.
- Claudia Haro, ex-wife of actor Joe Pesci. Pleaded no contest to attempted murder for hiring a hitman to kill her second ex-husband, Hollywood stunt-man Garrett Warren. She was sentenced to 12 years' imprisonment in 2012 and was released in 2019.
- Emily Harris, member of radical group Symbionese Liberation Army responsible for kidnapping of Patty Hearst; served eight years.
- Theresa Knorr (née Cross) – Was charged and found guilty of two counts of murder, two counts of conspiracy to commit murder, and two special circumstances charges: multiple murder and murder by torture. Was sentenced to two consecutive life sentences.
- Sabrina Limon, inmate, was convicted of the 2014 Murder of her husband, Robert. Sabrina's lover, Johnathan Hearn was the actual shooter, but Sabrina was convicted for her involvement in 2018. She's serving a sentence of 25 years to life, and will be eligible for parole in November of 2032.
- Members of Charles Manson's "Family": Patricia Krenwinkel, remaining incarcerated as of 2026. Susan Atkins, transferred to Central California Women's Facility in May 2008, died September 24, 2009. Leslie Van Houten was granted parole on July 11, 2023.
- Stephanie Lazarus, a former LAPD detective convicted in 2012 of the 1986 murder of a former boyfriend's wife. Incarcerated as of 2026, serving 27 years to life, parole hearings since 2023.
- Dorothea Puente, a convicted serial killer, "did two years and six months [at CIW] for a forgery conviction" beginning in 1984.
- Cathy Evelyn Smith, served time in December 1986 and March 1988 for involuntary manslaughter and drug charges related to the death of John Belushi.
- Brenda Ann Spencer, serving 25 years to life for killing two people and wounding nine at a school in San Diego in 1979.
- Lucille Miller, served 7 years, from 1965 until being paroled in 1972, of a life sentence for the first-degree murder of her husband in what prosecutors alleged was a real-life case of Double Indemnity. Miller's case was the subject of an essay by Joan Didion in her 1968 book Slouching Towards Bethlehem.

== See also ==
- California Institution for Men
