= Courtney Schulhoff =

American convicted murderer

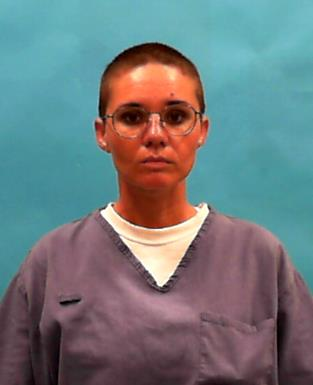
- Schulhoff Mugshot
- Born: Courtney Christine Schulhoff; December 27, 1987 (age 38); Washington, D.C., U.S.
- Status: Incarcerated at Lowell Correctional Institution
- Conviction: First degree murder
- Penalty: Life imprisonment; commuted to 40 years imprisonment
- Accomplice: Michael Morin

Details
- Date: February 9, 2004
- Country: United States
- State: Florida
- Locations: Altamonte Springs, Florida
- Target: Stephen Schulhoff
- Killed: 1
- Weapon: Louisville Slugger
- Date apprehended: February 11, 2004

Courtney Christine Schulhoff (born December 27, 1987) is an American prisoner who was convicted of the bludgeoning death of her father in his Altamonte Springs, Florida apartment when she was 16 years old. She was convicted of first-degree murder and was sentenced to life without the possibility of parole in September 2006. In March 2017, Schulhoff was given a reduced sentence of 40 years.

== Background ==
Courtney Schulhoff lived in Altamonte Springs, Florida with her father after her parents divorced. She attended Lyman High School, but had dropped out and was pursuing her GED. Before dropping out of school, 15-year-old Schulhoff began dating Michael Morin, a man whom she had met at a dog race track across the street from her high school. Morin, who was five years Schulhoff's senior, was on probation for car theft after stealing his father's car. Schulhoff's father did not approve of their relationship but the couple continued to date. They would often hang out at a local gas station where Schulhoff reportedly told Morin that her father physically abused her regularly.

== Murder ==
On the night of February 9, 2004, Schulhoff's father Stephen was beaten to death inside his apartment. After the murder, Schulhoff and Morin reportedly drove to a McDonald's 20 miles away in Orlando, Florida using Stephen Schulhoff's truck. Later in the afternoon, the couple returned to the apartment. Morin later said that he and Schulhoff had planned to take her father's body to Brevard County and throw it off a bridge.

Schulhoff and Morin were apprehended on February 11 after Stephen Schulhoff's girlfriend, Elaine Bouck, came to the apartment to check on Stephen. Bouck called 911 after seeing the couple flee from the apartment. Schulhoff later told police that she and Morin had decided to kill her father after her father had beaten her on February 9. She initially claimed that while she was out taking her father's dog for a walk, Morin had decided to "take care of the problem" and kill Stephen. Schulhoff claimed that when she returned to the apartment, she discovered Morin covered in blood and saw the baseball bat by the front door. She stated that Morin admitted to killing her father and threatened to kill her if she called authorities. Morin denied that he had initiated the killing, stating that Schulhoff left the Louisville Slugger baseball bat used to kill Stephen Schulhoff outside the bedroom door for him to use. Morin claimed that he had tried to talk Schulhoff out of killing her father, to no avail. He also claimed to have no memory of beating Stephen Schulhoff stating that he "blacked out" as soon as he grabbed the bat and only became lucid when he was washing the blood off his body after the attack. In a second interview with police, Schulhoff admitted that she waited at the apartment's tennis court area while Morin killed her father and intentionally left the baseball bat by the door for Morin.

== Trials and convictions ==
Courtney Schulhoff was the first of the defendants to stand trial. Her trial began on September 26, 2006. Prosecutors alleged that although Michael Morin had committed the murder, Schulhoff had orchestrated it. She did not testify in her own defense at the trial. The next day, she was found guilty of first-degree murder. Because she was only 16 when the murder was committed, she was ineligible for the death penalty; on September 27, 2006, she was sentenced to life without parole. After the judge handed down the obligatory sentence, Courtney Schulhoff spoke out in open court, stating: "Your Honor, I would like to openly admit in court that Michael Morin is not the person who killed my father. I was. So, I accept full responsibility, and I accept the verdict."

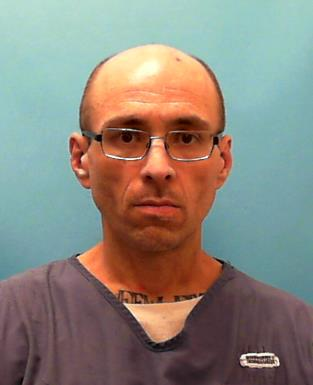
Michael Morin

Michael Morin's murder trial began on April 16, 2007. Unlike his former girlfriend, he was facing a death sentence if convicted. During his testimony, he admitted killing Stephen Schulhoff but expressed regret for the action. At the trial, Schulhoff also testified in Morin's defense. She had given a new deposition after her conviction, and stated that she was the one who had bludgeoned Stephen Schulhoff to death with the baseball bat. However, on April 26, 2007, Michael Morin was convicted. He was sentenced to life in prison without parole, and is serving his sentence at the Taylor Correctional Institution.

In 2009, Schulhoff was interviewed at the Lowell Correctional Institution in Ocala, Florida by RTL, a German news show, about the punishment of life without parole for juvenile offenders. In 2011, her case appeared on an episode of Snapped on the Oxygen Network. In 2015, Schulhoff was interviewed by former FBI criminal profiler Candice DeLong for the Investigation Discovery program Facing Evil.

In 2017, Schulhoff was given a reduced sentence of 40 years.

== See also ==
- Murders of Diane and Alan Scott Johnson
- Rachel Wade
