= Facing Evil with Candice DeLong =

American TV documentary series (2010–2014)

- Genre: Documentary
- Presented by: Candice DeLong
- Country of origin: United States
- Original language: English
- No. of seasons: 5
- No. of episodes: 36

Production
- Executive producers: Geoff Fitzpatrick; Pamela Deutsch
- Running time: 30 minutes
- Production company: Beyond Entertainment

Original release
- Network: Investigation Discovery
- Release: November 25, 2010 – January 17, 2014

Facing Evil with Candice DeLong is an American television documentary series on Investigation Discovery that debuted on November 25, 2010, as a two-part special, which later turned into a full series. Facing Evil is hosted by former FBI Profiler Candice DeLong as she visits different women's prisons and talks with female prisoners. At the end, she states whether or not she believes that someone is being truthful about what they're saying. The series ran for five seasons, ending in 2015.

== Episodes ==
| Season | Episodes | Season premiere | Season finale |
|---|---|---|---|
| 1 | 4 | November 25, 2010 | November 26, 2010 |
| 2 | 6 | November 25, 2011 | December 23, 2011 |
| 3 | 6 | November 23, 2012 | December 21, 2012 |
| 4 | 10 | November 29, 2013 | January 17, 2014 |
| 5 | 10 | June 11, 2015 | July 24, 2015 |

=== Season 1 (2010) ===
| No. overall | No. in season | Title | Original release date |
|---|---|---|---|
| 1 | 1 | "For Love of Oneself" | November 25, 2010 |
Candice interviews Susan Grund, a woman who murdered her husband in Peru, Indiana in 1992 as an attempt to collect money on a life insurance policy.
| 2 | 2 | "Daddy's Little Girl" | November 25, 2010 |
Candice travels to Wollongong in New South Wales to interview Belinda Van Krevel, the sister of notorious serial killer Mark Valera, who is also in prison for having her father murdered because he was alleged to be molesting Belinda's daughter.
| 3 | 3 | "Love Before Life" | November 26, 2010 |
Jennifer Reali, who was having an affair with a married man in Colorado Springs, Colorado and murdered his wife is interviewed by Candice regarding her crime.
| 4 | 4 | "Disorder of Affection" | November 26, 2010 |
Jennifer Hyatte, who shot and killed a correctional officer in Kingston, Tennessee after her husband was convicted on a robbery charge is interviewed on what happened the day she committed the crime.

=== Season 2 (2011) ===
| No. overall | No. in season | Title | Original release date |
|---|---|---|---|
| 5 | 1 | "Horseplay and Hired Guns" | November 25, 2011 |
Candice travels to New England to speak with Patricia Olsen, who is serving a prison sentence for hiring her son to murder her husband in Lanesborough, Massachusetts and their attempt to cover up the crime by making it look like an accident.
| 6 | 2 | "Fatal Fortune Hunter" | November 25, 2011 |
Candice goes to Gatesville, Texas to interview prisoner Celeste Beard, who murdered her husband in an attempt to inherit his money and hide an affair with another woman.
| 7 | 3 | "A Nail in the Coffin" | December 2, 2011 |
Dawn Silvernail of Pleasant Plains, New York is interviewed by Candice following her conviction of murderering Susan Fassett, after being coerced by Fred Andros.
| 8 | 4 | "Homicidal Honeymooner" | December 9, 2011 |
Candice talks with Ashley Humphrey, a woman from Pinellas Park, Florida who murdered the ex-girlfriend of her husband after she was planning to press charges against him.
| 9 | 5 | "The Black Widow Bride" | December 16, 2011 |
Candice interviews a series of greedy fortune tellers about their various crimes.
| 10 | 6 | "Teenage Terror" | December 23, 2011 |
Rachel Wade is interviewed by Candice in regards to her killing Sarah Ludemann in Pinellas County, Florida.

=== Season 3 (2012) ===
| No. overall | No. in season | Title | Original release date |
|---|---|---|---|
| 11 | 1 | "Stripped Bare" | November 23, 2012 |
Candice heads to Cincinnati to speak with Melissa Vanover, who is in prison for the murder of her boyfriend.
| 12 | 2 | "Friends 'Til the End" | November 23, 2012 |
Shirley Jo Phillips is interviewed by Candice regarding the murder of her former best friend Wilma Plaster in Hollister, Missouri.
| 13 | 3 | "Victim of Love" | November 30, 2012 |
Candice interviews Tyonne Palmer of Houston, who is charged with murdering the wife of a pastor with whom she was having an affair.
| 14 | 4 | "Teen Killers" | December 7, 2012 |
Candice holds an interview with Jennifer Bailey, who was charged and convicted in murdering her mother in Roanoke, Texas with the assistance of her boyfriend.
| 15 | 5 | "A Mother's Love" | December 14, 2012 |
Candice interviews Debbie Fleming regarding the fatal shooting of a young boy in West Orange, Texas in an attempt to save her son's life.
| 16 | 6 | "Caught in the Crossfire" | December 21, 2012 |
Jennifer Blattner, who killed her husband in Round Rock, Texas in an attempt to keep sole custody of their child is the subject of interview by Candice in the season finale.

=== Season 4 (2013-14) ===
| No. overall | No. in season | Title | Original release date |
|---|---|---|---|
| 17 | 1 | "In the Name of Love" | November 29, 2013 |
Candice holds an interview with convicted killer Laurie Kellogg, regarding the murder of her husband Bruce in New York state's Cayuga Lake.
| 18 | 2 | "Protecting Your Own" | November 29, 2013 |
Candice speaks with Tyra Whitney, a Fort Worth, Texas woman who killed her daughter's boyfriend with a hammer.
| 19 | 3 | "Blue Collar Bludgeoning" | December 6, 2013 |
Candice talks to Danny Pelosi, who is imprisoned for the murder of his wife's ex-husband Ted Ammon in East Hampton, New York.
| 20 | 4 | "A Military Affair" | December 6, 2013 |
Kimberly Parker, of Lewisville, Texas is interviewed by Candice about the murder of her husband and bringing her lover into the mix.
| 21 | 5 | "Paradise Lost" | December 13, 2013 |
Candice Talks with Ronald Samuels, a Pensacola, Florida man who put a hit out on his ex-wife.
| 22 | 6 | "Friendly Fire" | December 20, 2013 |
Sylvilla Humphrey, a Beaumont, Texas woman who shot her best friend in the neck over a love triangle is interviewed by Candice.
| 23 | 7 | "Bloody Murder" | December 27, 2013 |
Candice talks to Ernesto Ivan Martinez, a Brownsville, Texas resident who killed his friend and father figure Barry Horn.
| 24 | 8 | "Sex, Drugs & Rock n' Roll" | January 3, 2014 |
Candice speaks with Charles Dean Hood, about the killing of his girlfriend in Dallas.
| 25 | 9 | "Teenage Rampage" | January 10, 2014 |
Britney Gulley and Jeremisha Adams are responsible for a string of shootings and robberies that left two people dead and a third blind. Gulley is interviewed.
| 26 | 10 | "The Woods Strangler" | January 17, 2014 |
Candice talks to convicted murderer Larry Swearingen, who is imprisoned for a killing that happened in Montgomery County, Texas.

=== Season 5 (2015) ===
| No. overall | No. in season | Title | Original release date |
|---|---|---|---|
| 27 | 1 | "Lifting The Mask" | June 12, 2015 |
In 1986 the body of Patrice LaBlanc surfaced in Lake Livingston. She's been stabbed 39 times. Her boyfriend Cliff Youens, also known as drag queen Brandi West, is found guilty.
| 28 | 2 | "The Perfect Victim" | June 12, 2015 |
Greenwood, Indiana: Sarah 'Cindy' White set fire to a house and killed a family of six. Candice DeLong unravels years of abuse, but can it ever justify murder?
| 29 | 3 | "A Fatal Attraction" | June 19, 2015 |
In 1995, an elderly lady and her caretaker were murdered in a home invasion. Earl Linebaugh and Melissa Harris are found guilty and sentenced to life. However, Melissa says she's a victim too.
| 30 | 4 | "Gone Too Soon" | June 19, 2015 |
Jacksonville, Florida: Dylan was 3 months old when his mother, Alexandra Tobias shook him to death. She claims it was an accident but was found guilty of second degree murder and sentenced to 50 years.
| 31 | 5 | "A Craigslist Killer" | June 26, 2015 |
In 2009, a newsman was discovered stabbed in his bedroom. George Weber met his killer, 16-year-old John Katehis on Craigslist.
| 32 | 6 | "Death by Stiletto" | July 3, 2015 |
A night ends in tragedy when Stefan Andersson is bludgeoned to death by girlfriend Ana Trujillo. She claims self-defense but a jury found her guilty of murder.
| 33 | 7 | "The Angel of Death" | July 10, 2015 |
Within 2 months, 20 patients at a Texas hospital were murdered. Nurse Vickie Dawn Jackson was sentenced to life with no parole. She still claims she's innocent.
| 34 | 8 | "The Prime Suspect" | July 17, 2015 |
New Year's Eve in Pampa, Texas ends in triple homicide. Twila Busby and her two adult sons are found dead in their home. Her boyfriend Hank Skinner is later found guilty. He says he's innocent.
| 35 | 9 | "Killing One’s Own" | July 24, 2015 |
Loyd and Agnes Courtney were beaten and stabbed to death by their daughter, Deborah Pieringer. Prosecutors say it was for money, but Deborah says she didn't do it.
| 36 | 10 | "Teen Terrors" | July 24, 2015 |
Altamonte Springs, Florida: The body of Stephen Schulhoff was found beaten to death by a baseball bat. His daughter Courtney Schulhoff and her boyfriend are found guilty and sentenced to life with no parole.

== See also ==
- Deadly Women
- Snapped
- Wives with Knives
