= Candice DeLong =

Former FBI criminal profiler and criminologist

- Born: July 16, 1950 (age 75); Chicago, Illinois, U.S.
- Occupations: Criminal profiler TV series host television personality
- Years active: 1978-present
- Known for: Host of Investigation Discovery programs Deadly Women and Facing Evil with Candice DeLong, Discovery+ program The Deadly Type with Candice DeLong
- Spouse: John Raymond DeLong (divorced)
- Children: 1

Candice DeLong (born July 16, 1950) is an American former FBI criminal profiler and bestselling author. DeLong was the lead profiler in San Francisco, California, and worked on the Unabomber case. Currently, she hosts the Investigation Discovery programs Deadly Women and Facing Evil with Candice DeLong, the Wondery podcast Killer Psyche, and the Discovery+ program The Deadly Type with Candice DeLong.

== Early life ==
Born and raised in Chicago, Illinois, DeLong is the daughter of a building contractor father and a homemaker mother. Growing up, DeLong stated that her father had told her to choose a practical career. Before entering the field of criminal profiling, DeLong worked as a psychiatric nurse at Northwestern University Hospital in Chicago, Illinois. However, by the time she was 28 years old, she was a divorcee with a young son. Wanting a new career, DeLong went to Quantico, Virginia, in 1980 to attend the FBI training academy. She was one of seven female recruits. DeLong worked in the FBI's Chicago office after graduating from Quantico. DeLong stated that she used humor to ease tensions while working.

She claimed that her three career goals were as follows: "to be involved with a high-profile national criminal, I wanted to apprehend a serial killer, and I wanted to rescue a kidnap [sic] victim alive."

== Career ==
In 1982, DeLong became involved in the investigation of the Chicago Tylenol murders, in which seven people died from potassium cyanide-laced Tylenol capsules. Although no one was ever charged in the poisonings, the incident led to new packaging for over-the-counter medication and federal anti-tampering laws. Regarding the incident, DeLong stated that "You can thank the Tylenol killer for the fact that it now takes a blow torch to get into a bottle of Tylenol."

In 1995, DeLong was one of the three handpicked FBI agents to mastermind the manhunt for the Unabomber, Ted Kaczynski. Kaczynski had sent 16 bombs over a 17-year period to target areas, killing three people. After his 1995 capture in Lincoln, Montana, DeLong wrote that "he only cared about two things — his little quarter-acre of property and killing people."

DeLong, a member of the Child Abduction Task Force in San Francisco, California, stated that the greatest day of her career was when she was able to rescue a nine-year-old boy, a kidnapping victim who had been given crack cocaine and been forced to participate in child pornography. After learning of the abductor's whereabouts on a train in San Diego, California, the boy was saved.

Following DeLong's July 2000 retirement from the FBI, she published a book entitled Special Agent: My Life on the Front Lines as a Woman in the FBI. In the book, she discusses the criminal profiling process and how she helped solve high-profile cases. DeLong also dedicated a chapter in her book to personal safety, stating that "Prevention can be as simple as a deadbolt lock on your house."

In the early days of the investigation of the disappearance of Laci Peterson, DeLong stated in an interview with Diane Sawyer on Good Morning America that Laci's husband Scott Peterson was speaking about Laci in the past-tense, even though her body had not yet been discovered. She was criticized by Scott's supporters for saying that a pregnant Longview, Washington, woman who had appealed to a store clerk for help could not have been Laci Peterson because the woman claimed to have been kidnapped.

After the acquittal of Casey Anthony in the death of Caylee Anthony, DeLong told the Huffington Post that the prosecution must have offended the jury, because the amount of circumstantial evidence should have been enough to convict Casey.

DeLong currently hosts two programs on the Investigation Discovery Network: Deadly Women and Facing Evil with Candice DeLong. She serves as a subject-matter expert on Deadly Women, offering her professional opinions about the women profiled on the show. On Facing Evil, DeLong has profiled Jennifer Reali, Jennifer Hyatte, Susan Grund, Belinda Van Krevel, Patricia Olsen, Celeste Beard, Dawn Silvernail, Ashley Humphrey, Jill Coit, Rachel Wade, Shirley Jo Phillips, Tyonne Palmer, Jennifer Bailey, and Melissa Vanover from the inside a prison, discussing the women's motive for murder. DeLong also has a podcast on Wondery titled "Killer Psyche", and has been a frequent interview guest of Ronn Owens on the San Francisco Bay Area radio station KGO, and on Fox News. Her latest program, The Deadly Type with Candice DeLong on Discovery+, explores some of the common psychological types found among killers.
