= Tampa Bay Automobile Museum =

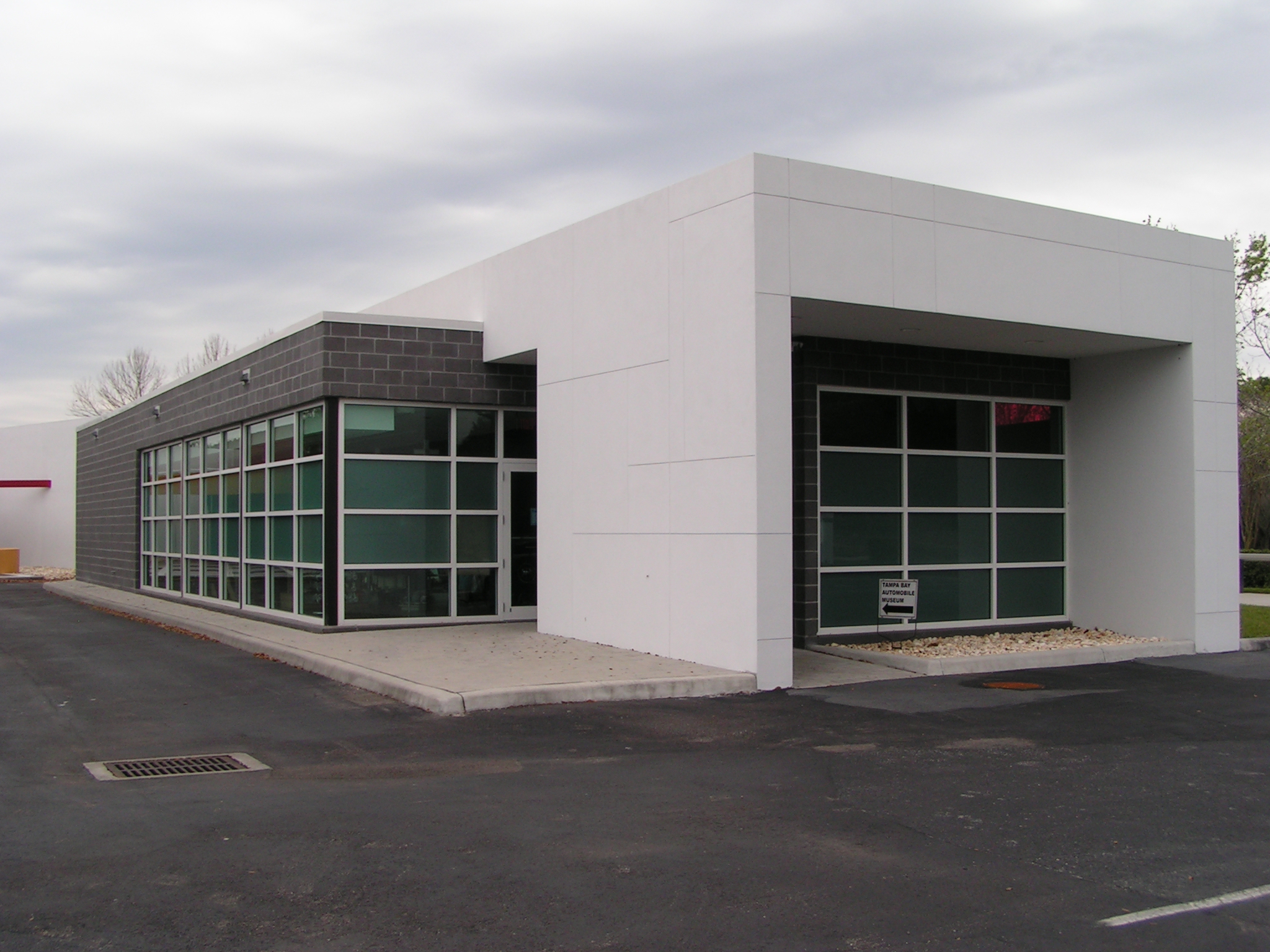
- Tampa Bay Automobile Museum

- Location within Florida
- Established: March 19, 2005; 21 years ago
- Location: 3301 Gateway Centre Boulevard; Pinellas Park, Florida 33782
- Coordinates: 27°51′8.50″N 82°40′44″W
- Type: Automotive
- Collections: Automotive engineering innovations, early 20th century art.
- Collection size: 90 cars Automobilia, over 200 art and lithography displays
- Presidents: Oliver & Emmanuel Cerf
- Curator: Susan Cerf
- Website: tbauto.org

The Tampa Bay Automobile Museum is an automobile museum in Pinellas Park, Florida, in the Tampa Bay area. The museum displays historic vehicles, primarily from the 20th century, with a focus on technical innovation, pioneering engineering concepts, and unusual designs.

== History ==
The museum was founded in March 2005 by French entrepreneur Alain Cerf, who also founded the packaging machinery company Polypack, Inc. The museum is located on Polypack's property. It is operated as a family-run institution.

In September 2019, the museum hosted a demonstration of a hydrogen fuel cell bus and a discussion on its potential use in local public transit.

== Collection ==
The museum's collection is housed in a 19,000-square-foot facility and features vehicles selected for their engineering advancements rather than mainstream popularity. Highlights include early front-wheel-drive automobiles, rear-engine air-cooled designs (such as models from Tatra), early experiments in aerodynamics, unibody construction, and alternative propulsion systems.

A notable exhibit is a fully operational, full-scale replica of the Fardier de Cugnot, a steam-powered vehicle built in 1770 by French engineer Nicolas-Joseph Cugnot. Widely regarded as the first self-propelled mechanical road vehicle, the museum's replica was completed in 2010.

The museum maintains an active restoration program through its Cerf Motorworks facility, with many vehicles kept in running condition.

== See also ==
- List of automobile museums
- List of transport museums
