= List of Wives with Knives episodes =

Wives with Knives is an American documentary television series broadcast on Investigation Discovery. The series debuted on November 23, 2012.

== Series overview ==
Season	Episodes	Originally released	
Season	Episodes	First released	Last released
1	6	November 23, 2012	December 28, 2012
2	8	November 29, 2013	January 17, 2014
3	10	November 29, 2014	January 30, 2015
4	8	November 27, 2015	January 22, 2016
5	8	November 25, 2016	January 20, 2017

== Episodes ==
=== Season 1 (2012) ===
No. overall	No. in series	Title	Original release date
1	1	"The Beefcake and the Beauty Queen"	November 23, 2012
Jamie Czerniawski, former Miss Teen New Jersey, is a single mother of two when she meets her husband Charlie, but the marriage deteriorates after Jamie appears on Wife Swap and Charlie discovers his wife's affair. After a confrontation, Jamie stabs Charlie, but claims self-defense and is not charged.
2	2	"Fourth Time's A Charm"	November 30, 2012
Donna Cobb was a single mother when she met her future husband Kevin Cobb. Soon after Kevin moves in, he becomes abusive towards Donna, but she stays with him, even after he goes to prison. Their relationship ends when she stabs him to death during a drunken argument, but Donna is acquitted due to self-defense.
3	3	"The Scorned Socialite"	December 7, 2012
Nancy Bautista (Anderson) was a registered nurse and three-time divorcee when she met her husband, Dr. Michael Bautista. Seven years into their marriage, their relationship has deteriorated. Nancy stabs her husband with a butcher knife, puncturing his lung, but not killing him. She is serving 19 years for attempted murder.
4	4	"Stripped to the Bone"	December 17, 2012
Crystal Mangum is a stripper who became infamous in 2006 for claiming she was raped by three members of the Duke lacrosse team. Five years later, she meets boyfriend Reginald Daye, but after a drunken argument, Crystal stabs him, and he dies 10 days later. Crystal is serving 14 to 18 years in prison.
5	5	"Pills, Poison and Payback"	December 21, 2012
Sarah Saunders is married to Tommy Shackelford, but she insists that her relationship is controlling. She tries poisoning her husband, but when that attempt fails, Sarah resorts to stabbing her husband in the head with a fishing knife. She calls police and attempts to report the attack as a robbery, but Tommy survives and implicates her.
6	6	"Lonely and Lethal"	December 28, 2012
Lori McLuckie is pregnant with her ex-boyfriend Andrew Vigil's baby. After he harasses and rapes her, Lori is pushed to her breaking point. She chains Andrew to her radiator, stabs him to death, then dismembers his body. Overcome with guilt, Lori confesses her crime, and she is serving 40 years to life in prison for murder.

=== Season 2 (2013–14) ===
No. overall	No. in series	Title	Original release date
7	1	"Dangerous Devotion"	November 29, 2013
Jameelah Jones grew up in urban Baltimore and became a paralegal. However, she was influenced by a career criminal, James Nixon. When James is released, he and Jameelah have a son, but when their relationship turns abusive, Jameelah stabs James. At the hospital, James refuses to implicate Jameelah as his attacker.
8	2	"Silent Secrets"	December 6, 2013
Courtney Ross (Larson) is a deaf woman from North Carolina who moved across the country to be with her boyfriend. When that relationship failed, she meets Jonathan, who is also deaf. They get married, but their honeymoon is short-lived. When Courtney learns Jonathan has another woman, she stabs him to death.
9	3	"The Serial Playboy"	December 13, 2013
Sherrse Gaines falls for her first love, Greg, but after he cheats on her, she leaves him for her new boyfriend Steve. Sherrse's relationship with Steve is rocky, and when she tries to break up with him, Steve turns violent. Sherrse stabs him with scissors, but the charges against her are dropped when Steve shoots up her car.
10	4	"Demons, Drugs and Darkness"	December 20, 2013
Annette Valdez (Hernandez) is a schizophrenic and drug addict. When she and her boyfriend Cameron find out she is pregnant, they get clean, but Annette's demons return and the couple breaks up. Annette begins a new relationship with her younger lover Tony, but a fight turns deadly when Annette stabs him twice.
11	5	"Can't Buy Me Love"	December 27, 2013
Julia Decatur-Schrader (Monica Fairview) is a divorced mother when she meets her husband at a bar. The couple live lavishly due to his income, but their relationship is troubled. Due to her extravagant lifestyle, Julia stays with him, but one confrontations ends with violence when she knifes him in the back and is sentenced to 8 years.
12	6	"When a Biker Comes to Bible Study"	January 3, 2014
Lydia Salce (portrayed by Laurie Burke) was a single mother working as an administrator at Walmart when she met her husband Michael McKee, a biker who served time in prison for arson and robbery. Lydia falls for Mike and they marry, but six months later, their marriage leads to bloodshed when Mike returns home drunk and begins attacking Lydia.
13	7	"The Blues and Blades Don't Mix"	January 10, 2014
Crystal Johnson is a young wife who is institutionalized due to severe postpartum depression after her daughter's birth. After her release, she works as a stripper, where she meets Lawrence and has a son with him. When he tries to leave her, she stabs him, and her violent history repeats itself with her subsequent lover, Jordan.
14	8	"Love is a Gamble"	January 17, 2014
Carol Singh and her family emigrated from Suriname to New York for new opportunities and a better life. Her family moves next door to a young man named Dave, who becomes Carol's boyfriend. However, when an argument between them turns violent, Carol stabs Dave, and she is convicted of manslaughter.

=== Season 3 (2014–15) ===
No. overall	No. in series	Title	Original release date
15	1	"Living the High Life"	November 29, 2014
Donna Buchanan was living the high life as a cocaine smuggler, but when her empire collapses, she becomes a drug addict. She is dependent on her landlord, an older man named Charles Gouveia who becomes her boyfriend. After an abusive, six-year relationship, Donna stabs her boyfriend 54 times. She serves almost 13 years in prison for her crime.
16	2	"The Politics of Love"	December 6, 2014
Diane Reilly visits a psychic, who informs her that she will fall in love with a man with the last name Reilly. She falls for Joe Reilly, a charismatic politician. Shortly after their wedding, however, Joe becomes abusive. When a romantic night goes awry, Diane stabs her husband. She is sent to prison for 9 months, but upon her release, she returns to Joe.
17	3	"The Sexual Misfit"	December 13, 2014
Krista Goley (Clark) is an awkward teen who runs away to join the circus. She uses sex as a way to get attention from men, but a failed teen marriage leaves her a single mother. She decides to join the military, and falls for new recruit Tim. When her new relationship unravels, Krista stabs Tim to death; she is convicted of manslaughter and is sentenced to 27 years in prison.
18	4	"The 26 Year War"	December 20, 2014
Laureen Rugen was a young woman when she became pregnant by a married man. She began dating and married her husband Chris, but the couple's marriage was abusive. After suffering years of domestic abuse at her husband's hands, Laureen snaps and stabs Chris more than 25 times. She pleads guilty to manslaughter for her crime.
19	5	"Battlefield of Love"	December 27, 2014
Charlene Jackson, a recent high school grad, meets her husband Paul right before she leaves for basic training. Instead of enlisting, she moves in with Paul and the two marry. When their relationship sours, she enlists and falls in love with a fellow soldier. Upon her return, things turn violent when Charlene asks for a divorce, and both she and Paul are stabbed.
20	6	"Stranger In My House"	January 2, 2015
After a failed marriage and an abusive relationship with a cruel boyfriend, Liz Cahoon finally finds the perfect man in Eric. But the ghosts of her past and the demons of her addiction mix to cause an out of body trance that leads to bloody attack.
21	7	"Mama's Little Princess"	January 9, 2015
Nicole Taylor is a spoiled princess never learned how to be independent. Spending a lifetime abusing drugs and chasing bad boys, she falls head over heels for Freddie. Her obsession with Freddie turns a lover's quarrel into a violent ending.
22	8	"Army of Lovers"	January 16, 2015
Former track star Fatimah Leday joins the army, where she meets a smooth talking soldier named Carlton.The two return to the U.S. and marry. Unfortunately, Fatimah still wants to sow her wild oats, leading to a full scale war with her husband.
23	9	"Can't Let Go"	January 23, 2015
Jamie Santos is a wild child who refuses to be tamed.She meets Jonathan and quickly becomes obsessed with him.They break up but later reunite, marry and have a child. But her jealousy eventually boils over with devastating consequences.
24	10	"The Ecstasy and the Agony"	January 30, 2015
A romance fueled by sex, drugs and violence makes front-page news in Miami.

=== Season 4 (2015–16) ===
No. overall	No. in series	Title	Original release date
25	1	"You're Going to Die Tonight"	November 27, 2015
Edna Wilson's reunion with a high-school flame leads to a whirlwind romance and marriage, then jealousy rips the relationship apart, and it ends in a fierce battle of wills.
26	2	"Born This Way"	December 4, 2015
Transgender woman Terri Pearson is forced to fight for her life after finding romance with a man who abuses her.
27	3	"Love Is My Drug"	December 11, 2015
Debra Hudson dedicates herself to helping others, then a volatile relationship causes her own addictions to resurface with a vengeance.
28	4	"Romance on the Open Road"	December 18, 2015
Karen Miller's new romance with a co-worker is fuelled by alcohol and abuse, then she is forced to defend herself against him by plunging a knife into his neck.
29	5	"Sin City Secrets"	January 1, 2016
When Tina Gardner meets Andre, a partnership is formed and their new business venture takes Las Vegas by storm. Soon, however, the pressure leads to accusations of cheating and abuse, and one of them ends up dead.
30	6	"The Quiet Storm"	January 8, 2016
When Tamara gets pregnant, she and Leo are forced to marry, but the strain of raising a family rips them apart. Tamara falls for a childhood friend, Marvin, but the romance turns ugly when he starts abusing her and she fights back with a knife.
31	7	"Out on a Limb"	January 15, 2016
After two failed relationships, Michelle Covington is swept off her feet by a former high school classmate, but excessive drinking makes him abusive, and a fight between the two ends with a stab wound.
32	8	"Family Ties"	January 22, 2016
Scarred by childhood traumas, a young woman struggles to rebuild her life and becomes engaged to the man of her dreams. However, their relationship crumbles and ultimately comes to a bloody end.

=== Season 5 (2016–17) ===
No. overall	No. in series	Title	Original release date
33	1	"Now We're Even"	November 25, 2016
34	2	"I Slay"	December 2, 2016
35	3	"Addicted to Love"	December 9, 2016
36	4	"Not My Cup of Tea"	December 16, 2016
37	5	"Southern Spirit"	December 30, 2016
38	6	"Perils of Paranoia"	January 6, 2017
39	7	"Shear Rage"	January 13, 2017
40	8	"Poetic Justice"	January 20, 2017
