= Wives with Knives =

American TV documentary series (2012–2017)

- Genre: Television documentary
- Presented by: Dr. Casey Jordan
- Country of origin: United States
- Original language: English
- No. of seasons: 5
- No. of episodes: 40 (list of episodes)

Production
- Executive producers: David M. Frank; Eugenie Vink
- Running time: 42 minutes
- Production company: Indigo Films

Original release
- Network: Investigation Discovery
- Release: November 23, 2012 – January 20, 2017

Wives with Knives is an American television documentary series on Investigation Discovery produced by David Frank of Indigo Films. The series debuted on November 23, 2012. Season 2, which consists of eight episodes, premiered on November 29, 2013. The series was cancelled in 2017, after its fifth season.

== Premise ==
Wives with Knives tells the story of various women who committed crimes on their partners. Within each episode, the women tell the tale of the crime they committed and what led each couple to their demise. Interviews with the victims themselves are also shown.

== Episodes ==
Season	Episodes	Originally released	
Season	Episodes	First released	Last released
1	6	November 23, 2012	December 28, 2012
2	8	November 29, 2013	January 17, 2014
3	10	November 29, 2014	January 30, 2015
4	8	November 27, 2015	January 22, 2016
5	8	November 25, 2016	January 20, 2017

== See also ==
- Deadly Women
- Facing Evil with Candice DeLong
- Snapped
