= Murder of Sandra Rozzo =

Shooting death of a bartender in Pinellas Park, Florida, U.S., in 2003

Sandra Lee "Sandee" Rozzo was a Pinellas Park, Florida, bartender who was shot to death in her driveway on July 5, 2003. Her abuser, Timothy "Tracey" Humphrey, and his wife Ashley Laney Humphrey, were convicted of her murder.

== Perpetrators ==
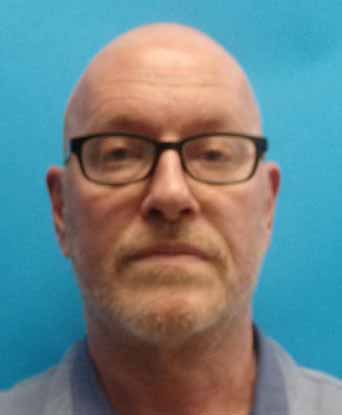
Timothy Humphrey

Timothy Alvin "Tracey" Humphrey (born November 15, 1966) was Sandee Rozzo's coworker at the time of her murder. They had previously been in a brief, but volatile relationship. He had committed an assault on Rozzo and criminal proceedings were in progress. The two had originally met at an Ybor City, Florida nightclub in November 2001 where Humphrey worked as a doorman and Rozzo was a bartender. Humphrey had a long previous criminal record of convictions for motor vehicle theft, kidnapping and aggravated assault. The following February, Humphrey was arrested for felony battery after allegedly beating and sexually assaulting Rozzo. He was due to go to trial on that charge on August 4, 2003, one month after Rozzo's murder.

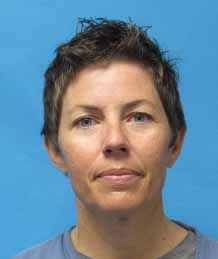
Ashley Christine Humphrey

Ashley Christine Humphrey (née Laney; born October 13, 1982) was working at Planet Smoothie in Brandon, Florida when she met Tracey Humphrey at a local gym in 2002. Ashley and Tracey married on July 4, 2003, one day before Rozzo's murder.

== Investigation ==
On July 5, 2003, Sandee Rozzo was shot to death in the garage of her Pinellas Park, Florida townhouse after returning home from her shift at the Green Iguana, a local bar. Rozzo's coworker Tracey Humphrey became the prime suspect. Humphrey had an alibi however, claiming that he had ordered a pizza to his Brandon, Florida apartment at the time of the crime. This was verified by an acquaintance, Tobe White. Further investigation however, revealed that his wife of one day, Ashley Humphrey, was not at home during the crime, as cell phone records indicated that Ashley was actually in Pinellas Park, Florida when Rozzo was killed. Ashley Humphrey was arrested for the first-degree murder of Sandra Rozzo and her husband Tracey Humphrey was charged with a federal firearms possession. While she was in custody, Ashley Humphrey decided to cooperate with authorities. She had admitted that she shot Sandra Rozzo to death, but claimed it was at the behest of her husband. In her statement, she told vivid details about the plot to murder Rozzo. In addition, she also gave up details regarding another failed murder attempt against Rozzo. In a plea bargain, Ashley was allowed to plead guilty to second-degree murder in exchange for testimony against her husband. This gave prosecutors enough evidence to charge Tracey Humphrey with first-degree murder.

== Trial ==
Tracey Humphrey's murder trial began in February 2006. As part of her plea deal, Ashley testified against her husband. Under oath, she testified how she waited hours for Rozzo to get off work at the Green Iguana, and then followed her back to her Pinellas Park home, where she fired eight shots into her. Tracey Humphrey testified in his own defense, stating that the killing was Ashley's idea. The jury did not find him convincing. He was convicted of first-degree murder on February 25, 2006. Even though he faced the death penalty, jurors opted for life without parole, believing that it would be a harsher punishment than death in this case.

Tracey Humphrey is serving his sentence at South Bay Correctional Facility in South Bay, Florida, Inmate Number: 930490. Post-conviction, he was sentenced to an additional 15 years for a pre-trial escape attempt in April 2004.

On March 10, 2006, Ashley Humphrey was sentenced to 25 years for murder. She is currently incarcerated at the Gadsden Correctional Facility in Quincy, Florida, Inmate Number: 154362. She is scheduled to be released from prison on December 13, 2028; she will be 46 years old.

== Media ==
This case has been profiled from various perspectives on Dateline NBC, 48 Hours, Vengeance: Killer Lovers, Snapped, and On the Case with Paula Zahn; Ashley was interviewed by FBI profiler Candice DeLong for an episode of DeLong's Investigation Discovery series, Facing Evil. On 13 July 2017, Killer Woman was shown on ITV with Piers Morgan interviewing Ashley. Homicide: Hours to Kill, season two, episode nine, also covered the case. In 2020, the Investigation Discovery channel aired their perspective of this case in the season 1, episode 10 show on A Time to Kill.
