= Murder of Sarah Ludemann =

2009 murder in Pinellas Park, United States

- Location of Pinellas Park in Florida
- Location: Pinellas Park, Florida, U.S.
- Date: April 14, 2009; 17 years ago c.11:00 p.m. (ET)
- Attack type: Stabbing
- Weapon: Kitchen knife
- Victims: Sarah Rose Ludemann, aged 18
- Perpetrator: Rachel Marie Wade
- Motive: Jealousy due to a love triangle
- Convictions: Second-degree murder
- Sentence: 27 years imprisonment, with an expected early release in 2032
- Judge: Joseph Bulone

On April 14, 2009, 18-year-old Sarah Ludemann was murdered by 19-year-old Rachel Wade in Pinellas Park, Florida, United States. Police attributed the murder to a romantic rivalry as part of a greater "love hexagon".

Wade was convicted of second-degree murder in 2010 and sentenced to 27 years imprisonment.

== Background ==
Sarah Rose Ludemann was born December 7, 1990, to Charles and Gay Ludemann. She was a student at Pinellas Park High School.

Rachel Marie Wade was born February 27, 1990, to Barry and Janet Wade. She was employed as a waitress at an Applebee's restaurant.

Ludemann and Wade were romantic rivals who were competing for the affections of Wade's ex-boyfriend, Josh Camacho. In the first six months of Ludemann's relationship with Camacho, police officers spoke to her six times regarding public confrontations with him. Ludemann also got into a verbal argument with the mother of Camacho's child. Camacho exhibited domestic violence against Ludemann, whom he punched in the face, but Ludemann did not press charges.

After learning of Ludemann's relationship with Camacho, Wade left insulting voicemails for Ludemann. Their rivalry quickly turned violent. They began to harass one another, and according to Wade, Ludemann would show up at an Applebee's where Wade worked in order to taunt her. During one incident, Ludemann told police that Wade repeatedly called her cell phone and left threatening voicemails.

== Murder ==
On the evening of Tuesday April 14, 2009, authorities say that Wade was alone in her apartment waiting for Camacho. Camacho was watching movies with Ludemann. While Wade was outside walking her dog, she heard a car honk, and she stated that Ludemann yelled "Stay away from my man!" Wade said that she was scared and that she decided to call Javier Laboy, an old boyfriend. He told her to come over to his house. She got her purse, opened a kitchen drawer, and pulled out a steak knife.

At 11 p.m., Wade approached Camacho's house. He and Ludemann were inside playing video games. Wade sent Camacho a text message stating "Now I know why you're not talking to me — because you got her." Camacho replied "That's right. I don't like you no more. Why don't you go home?" Wade responded "No. I'll wait for her to go home." Witnesses later testified that they overheard Wade threaten Ludemann on speakerphone "I'm going to stab you and your Mexican boyfriend." Just before midnight, Camacho's sister asked Ludemann for a ride to McDonald's. Ludemann saw a friend at a stop sign who told her Wade was at Javier Laboy's house. Ludemann decided to confront her. As she was driving, Wade called her and yelled "I'm going to stab you! You and your Mexican boyfriend!" Ludemann arrived at Javier Laboy's house and saw Wade speaking with him and their friend Dustin Grimes.

Wade testified that Ludemann slammed on her brakes, nearly hitting Wade and stormed out of the car with her fists flailing. Wade said that she was fearful when she stabbed Ludemann's shoulder and chest, one blow punctured her heart. However, authorities and the prosecution's witnesses said that Ludemann did not get a chance to leave the van and that it was Wade who approached and attacked Ludemann. Ludemann, mortally wounded, and clutching her chest, called Camacho to tell him what happened. Camacho ran to Ludemann's home to tell her father. They both drove to the scene. Immediately after the stabbing, witnesses say that Wade threw the knife over a neighbor's house and calmly said "I'm done." Ludemann died at Northside Hospital as a result of a heart puncture and was pronounced dead at 2:20 a.m. the next morning.

Police arrived and began questioning Wade and the witnesses. She began to cry when they told her Ludemann died. Hours later, Wade was arrested and charged with murder in the second degree. She was booked into the Pinellas County Jail on $500,000 bond. She stayed there through the conclusion of the trial.

== Trial and conviction ==
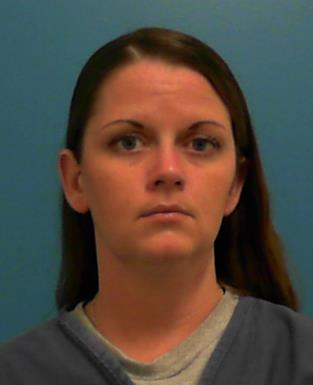
Wade's mugshot by the Florida Department of Corrections

TruTV's In Session televised the trial which began on July 20, 2010, with jury selection. After television coverage ended at 3pm each day, a live internet stream was provided by CNN. Testimony lasted three days from July 21 through July 23. Prosecutors brought up the history between the two in order to show that Wade intended to kill her rival over Camacho. The defense argued self-defense under Florida's Stand Your Ground law. Wade's attorney, Jay Hebert, stated that Ludemann was very upset and that Wade was fearful because she was outnumbered and because Ludemann was bigger than she. Hebert brought up the Applebee's incident in which Ludemann and her friends knocked Wade's tray over, sang Girlfight during karaoke and taunted her. He also stated that the two women fought before the stabbing and pulled each other's hair. The witnesses who testified for the prosecution were Camacho, his sister, and Dustin Grimes. Javier testified for the defense. Javier stated that the two fought, but admitted he did not see much of the incident. Camacho's sister and Grimes testified that Wade approached the vehicle and stabbed Ludemann. The jury heard the voicemails, which Ludemann saved eight months prior, in which Wade stated that she was going to kill her. This ultimately sealed her fate as the jury of five men and one woman took just two and a half hours to find her guilty of murder in the second degree.

On September 3, 2010, Rachel Wade was sentenced to 27 years in state prison. The judge stated that he believed Wade intended to kill Ludemann. Wade maintained that she acted in self-defense, and appealed her case. In a March 2011 interview with ABC News, she said that she believed that social media played a major part in the rivalry and murder, noting that social media gives people the ability to say whatever they want with very little consequence. In April 2011, Charlie Ludemann, Sarah's father, filed a civil suit against Wade. On February 17, 2012, Wade lost her appeal.

As of September 2023, Wade remains in custody at the Lowell Correctional Institution's Lowell Annex, 10 miles (16 km) north of Ocala, Florida. She is scheduled for release on March 21, 2032.

== Media ==
Ludemann's murder and Wade's trial have been discussed on television series such as Dateline NBC in February 2011, Deadly Women in November 2011, and Facing Evil with Candice DeLong in December 2011. It was also profiled on the E! Entertainment Special When Girls Kill. The murder case was featured on the shows Snapped on October 7, 2012, Killerpost on February 13, 2016, and Mean Girl Murders on April 29, 2024. On December 7, 2016, Crime Watch Daily also covered it. The case was later examined on the "Fatal Love Triangle" episode of the series Vengeance: Killer Lovers which aired on HLN on March 17, 2019.

In 2022, the feud between Wade and Sarah Ludemann served as the inspiration for the Lifetime film He's Not Worth Dying For as part of its "Ripped from the Headlines" feature film series. It stars Rachel Boyd as Isla Masters (who is based on Wade), Hilda Martin as Grace Heinemann (who is based on Ludemann), Robin Givens as Cher Heinemann, and Lachlan Quarmby as Jake Carter (who is based on Camacho).

== See also ==
- Murder of Moriah Wilson, a 2022 murder with a similar fate
