= Pinellas Park High School =

Public school in Florida, United States

Coordinates: 27.8808567°N 82.7242671°W

Location
- 6305 118th Ave; Largo, Florida 33773; United States

Information
- Type: Public
- Established: 1976
- Principal: Jeffrey Larson
- Teaching staff: 89.00 (FTE)
- Grades: 9-12
- Enrollment: 1,919 (2022-23)
- Student to teacher ratio: 21.56
- Colors: Red, white and blue
- Mascot: Patriot
- Rival: Dixie M. Hollins High School
- Yearbook: Occurrences
- Website: https://pp-hs.pcsb.org/

Pinellas Park High School is a public secondary school in Largo, Florida, United States. It opened in the fall of 1976 and is part of the Pinellas County Schools system. The school mascot is the Patriot, and the school colors are red, white and blue. The school newspaper is called the Powder Horn Press and the yearbook is Occurrences. The school is home to the Criminal Justice Academy magnet program, as well as the First Responders magnet program.

== History ==
Pinellas Park High School, located in Largo, Florida, opened its doors in August 1976. Because of the United States Bicentennial occurring that year, it adopted the name "The Patriots" and chose red, white, and blue as its school colors. In 2001, the school received a $500,000 grant to develop smaller learning communities. Five SLCs comprising the entire school population exist today: Freshman Forum (for incoming freshmen); Arts & Humanities; Environmental, Medical and Biological Alliance; Sophomore Seminar, and Business Design Technologies. The ESOL program helps foreign-language speakers and GOALS acts as a drop-out prevention program. As a result of the Pinellas County introduction of Choice schools, 80% of the school's students come from throughout the county.

== Student demographics ==
The total student population of approximately 2,300 students comprises 70.3% Caucasians, 12.7% African-Americans, 9.5% Hispanics, 5.9% Asians, 0.2% American Indian, and 1.4% Other. The student attendance rate is 92.7%. Pinellas Park High School is one of the most ethnically diverse schools of the country, comprising a large number of students from Latin and Asian countries. ESOL students form 6% of the total school population, and special education students make up 17% of the student body. PPHS is one of the district centers for special education students.

== Programs ==
=== Criminal Justice Academy ===
The Criminal Justice Academy is a four-year magnet program at Pinellas Park High School that teaches students about the American legal system and the careers found in that system. Students must apply for the Criminal Justice Academy. Eighth grade applicants must have stanines of 5 or higher on standardized tests, GPA of 2.5 or higher for all work in sixth and seventh grades, 2 positive academic teacher recommendations, and good discipline and attendance records. Mainstream sophomores may join if they didn't have the opportunity the year before.

=== First Responders ===
The school's First Responders program was founded in 2009. The program teaches students emergency planning and response along with first aid, CPR, and gives students chances for certifications with FEMA and the basic HAZMAT training. The senior classes have a chance to take a college EMR class and participate in Pinellas Park High's "Disaster Day," where the underclassmen act as if a natural disaster has occurred and depend on the seniors to assist, take control of, and isolate the situation. The students who join the First Responder program are required to volunteer with the community to illustrate the program's involvement and dedication to the community

== Building ==
The main building has over 40,000 square feet (3,716 m^{2}) of space and was built in 1976. The building includes a gymnasium and auditorium, a media center and library, several computer labs, a well-furnished weight room, a complete autobody shop, and a complete printing shop.

The CJA building was built between 1996 and 1998 and opened to students in the fall of 1998. The building has 8,496 square feet (789 m^{2}) of space, including several classrooms, administration offices, a mock courtroom, and an apartment used as a mock crime scene.

== 1988 school shooting ==
A shooting happened at the school on Thursday, February 11, 1988. Two 15-year-old male students who lived together, Jason Harless and Jason McCoy, planned the shooting after McCoy was suspended from the school on February 9 for telling a teacher "You piss me off". Assistant principal Nancy Blackwelder signed the suspension order. On February 10, the boys ran away from home and stole two .38-caliber handguns from deputy sheriff corporal Charles Parker's house, purportedly to protect themselves. McCoy also threatened to shoot a classmate who was dating his ex-girlfriend, Carla Hesketh. Harless was described by his peers and family as a "poor student who didn't like school".

On the first day of McCoy's suspension, school officials called the police when they saw McCoy trespassing on school grounds. MCCoy and Harless were showing off their stolen guns to friends in the school cafeteria. There were 600 students in the cafeteria and 1800 students in the school in total. The armed teenagers were quickly reported to school administrators. When assistant principal Glenn Bailey saw McCoy, McCoy ran away and withdrew the gun from his blue jeans. Two other assistant principals, Richard Allen and Nancy Blackwelder, also saw McCoy and demanded to let them escort him to the principal's office. A struggle ensued. Together, the two administrators grappled McCoy to the ground and knocked the gun out of his hands.

The situation escalated when Harless saw his best friend on the ground from a few tables away. Harless punched the administrators. Joseph Bloznalis II, a 22-year-old assistant physical education teacher and intern from the University of South Florida, grabbed Harless from behind. Harless then shot Bloznalis's left leg. Richard Allen, another assistant principal, approached Harless from behind and attempted to dislodge the gun from Harless' hand. Harless reached back and shot Allen in the temple, point-blank. Harless then aimed at the middle of Blackwelder's back, but she turned, so she was shot three times in her arm, stomach, and leg instead. A 17-year-old student, David Getchel, ran towards Harless and got kicked in the stomach. After all the nearby school staff were shot, Harless and McCoy ran out of the school.

When nearby students saw Allen shot in the head and fallen on the ground, they rushed out of the cafeteria screaming. Students who were further away initially thought the shots were firecrackers. Some students tipped over lunch tables to use as shields. Upon realizing that the noises were gunfire, hundreds of students hurried out of the school for safety. School was canceled for the rest of the day, and students went home after signing a check-out sheet.

The school resource officer was sick and absent on the day of shooting. Due to an unrelated incident, there was a responding team of police officers at the school who were unaware of the shooting that just took place in the cafeteria. As Harless attempted to flee, he panicked and began a shootout with the police outside the school entrance. During the shootout, a bullet that grazed his shoulder and he fell into the bushes. Harless was then arrested. McCoy was later captured over a mile away at his ex-girlfriend's house, where police found a third stolen gun. The police communicated with McCoy for an hour over a megaphone and telephone before McCoy surrendered from the house.

Allen was placed on life support and died six days later at Orlando Health Bayfront Hospital. Getchel was treated at the same hospital due to an injury to his ribs. After she recovered from her injuries, Blackwelder worked at the school for another year and a half. Due to PTSD, she left the school and became a school bus safety specialist. Harless told his mother that he never intended to hurt Richard Allen. In 2012 interview, Harless said that he never planned to shoot anyone. When asked in the same interview about what could prevent shootings, Harless answered "Nothing. At the end of the day, there are no preventable measures. It's human nature."

Police initially refused to name the suspects, but they were identified by classmates, family and friends. Harless was convicted of second degree murder on January 8, 1989, and sentenced to 17 years in adult prison. He was later released after eight years imprisonment after serving his sentence in the Sumter Correctional Institution. McCoy pled guilty and was convicted of third degree murder and three counts of armed burglary. and sentenced to six years in adult prison, but served 14 months in a "youthful offenders" facility. Neither Harless nor McCoy have been known to attend any of the annual homecoming events at the school each fall. As of 2012, records indicate that McCoy was living in Tennessee, and Harless in an interview said he was living in Holiday, Florida. Both Harless and McCoy later earned high school equivalency diplomas during their sentences.

== Notable alumni ==
- Browning Nagle - Former New York Jets quarterback
- Kyle Sokol - Bass Player for Nocturnus, Nasty Savage, Rude Squad, and Crimson Glory (Astronomica) with Wade Black
- Pamela Stein - Playboy Playmate
- Lawrance Toafili - professional football running back
- Fez Whatley - Radio Personality from the Ron & Fez show on terrestrial radio and Sirius XM.
