= High school equivalency diploma =

Alternative to high school diploma and GED

The High School Equivalency Diploma (HSED) or High School Equivalency Program (HEP) is an alternative education program to earning a high school diploma or passing the GED. Sometimes it can be synonymous. When spelled HSed, it can mean home schooled.

In some places, such as Wisconsin, the HSED is equivalent to a high school diploma because the Department of Public Instruction awards the credential. It is different from the GED, which only certifies the individual has the equivalent of a traditional high school education. Similar programs can be found in other states such as California. There are five ways to achieve the HSED according to the Wisconsin State Law establishing the HSED:

- PI 5.05 - Take the GED tests and pass three other skill required courses plus a career counseling section.
- PI 5.06 - Complete unfinished high school credits at a local high school or college.
- PI 5.07 - Attain 24 semester or 32 quarter credits at a university or technical college; electives are allowed.
- PI 5.08 - Have a foreign degree or diploma.
- PI 5.09 - Go through an approved special high school completion program offered by a technical college or other group.

There are currently no venues for achieving a valid GED or HSED credential online. A number of diploma mills claim to offer such a service, but they are unofficial and invalid.

== See also ==
- Distance education
