= Browning Nagle =

American football player (1968–2026)

- Nagle with the New York Jets in 1992

No. 8, 18, 13, 7
- Position: Quarterback

Personal information
- Born: April 29, 1968; Philadelphia, Pennsylvania, U.S.
- Died: April 10, 2026 (aged 57); Louisville, Kentucky, U.S.
- Listed height: 6 ft 3 in (1.91 m)
- Listed weight: 220 lb (100 kg)

Career information
- High school: Pinellas Park (Largo, Florida)
- College: West Virginia (1986); Louisville (1987–1990)
- NFL draft: 1991: 2nd round, 34th overall pick

Career history
- New York Jets (1991–1993); Indianapolis Colts (1994); Atlanta Falcons (1995–1996); Orlando Predators (1999); Buffalo Destroyers (2000)

Career NFL statistics
- Passing attempts: 437
- Passing completions: 213
- Completion percentage: 48.7%
- TD–INT: 8–20
- Passing yards: 2,489
- Passer rating: 53.5
- Stats at Pro Football Reference

Career AFL statistics
- Comp. / Att.: 303 / 553
- Passing yards: 4,120
- TD–INT: 74–18
- Passer rating: 98.68
- Stats at ArenaFan.com

Browning Kenneth Nagle (April 29, 1968 – April 10, 2026) was an American professional football player who was a quarterback in the National Football League (NFL) for the New York Jets, Indianapolis Colts, and Atlanta Falcons. He played college football for the Louisville Cardinals and was selected by the Jets in the second round of the 1991 NFL draft. He also played professionally in the Arena Football League (AFL) for the Orlando Predators and Buffalo Destroyers.

== Early life ==
Nagle played for Pinellas Park High School graduating in 1986.

== College career ==
Nagle began his college career at West Virginia University the same year as Major Harris. When it became clear that West Virginia would go with Harris and an option offense, Nagle transferred to the University of Louisville and played for Howard Schnellenberger. 1989 Second team All-South Independent football team selection. He was named one of the Most Valuable Players in the 1991 Fiesta Bowl, where he set many passing records, one of which was 451 passing yards against the Alabama Crimson Tide.

== Professional career ==
Pre-draft measurables
Height	Weight	Arm length	Hand span
6 ft 2 1/4 in (1.89 m)	231 lb (105 kg)	30 in (0.76 m)	10 in (0.25 m)

Nagle was drafted in the second round by the Jets in the 1991 NFL draft with the 34th pick overall, one pick after the Atlanta Falcons selected Brett Favre.

From 1991 to 1993, he played in 18 total games for New York, the most in 1992 with 14, 13 as a starter that season. He threw for a total of 2,361 yards as a Jet with 199 completions on 403 attempts with seven touchdowns and 17 interceptions over that three-year span with a win-loss record of 3–10. In 1994, he started in one game for the Indianapolis Colts throwing eight completions on 21 attempts and 69 yards with no touchdowns and one interception in his lone win of the season. Nagle signed with the Atlanta Falcons in 1995 seeing action in 1996 in five games, going 6–13 for 59 yards, one touchdown and two interceptions.

In 1999, Nagle joined the Orlando Predators of the Arena Football League and made 146 completions on 275 attempts for 1,991 yards, 39 touchdowns, and nine interceptions. He played for the Buffalo Destroyers in 2000 and passed for 2,129 yards on 157 completions of 278 attempts, 35 touchdowns, and nine interceptions.

== Death ==
Nagle died in Louisville on April 10, 2026, at the age of 57, from colon cancer.
