= Kingston courthouse shooting =

2005 murder in Kingston, Tennessee, US

Coordinates: 35.8711°N 84.5149°W

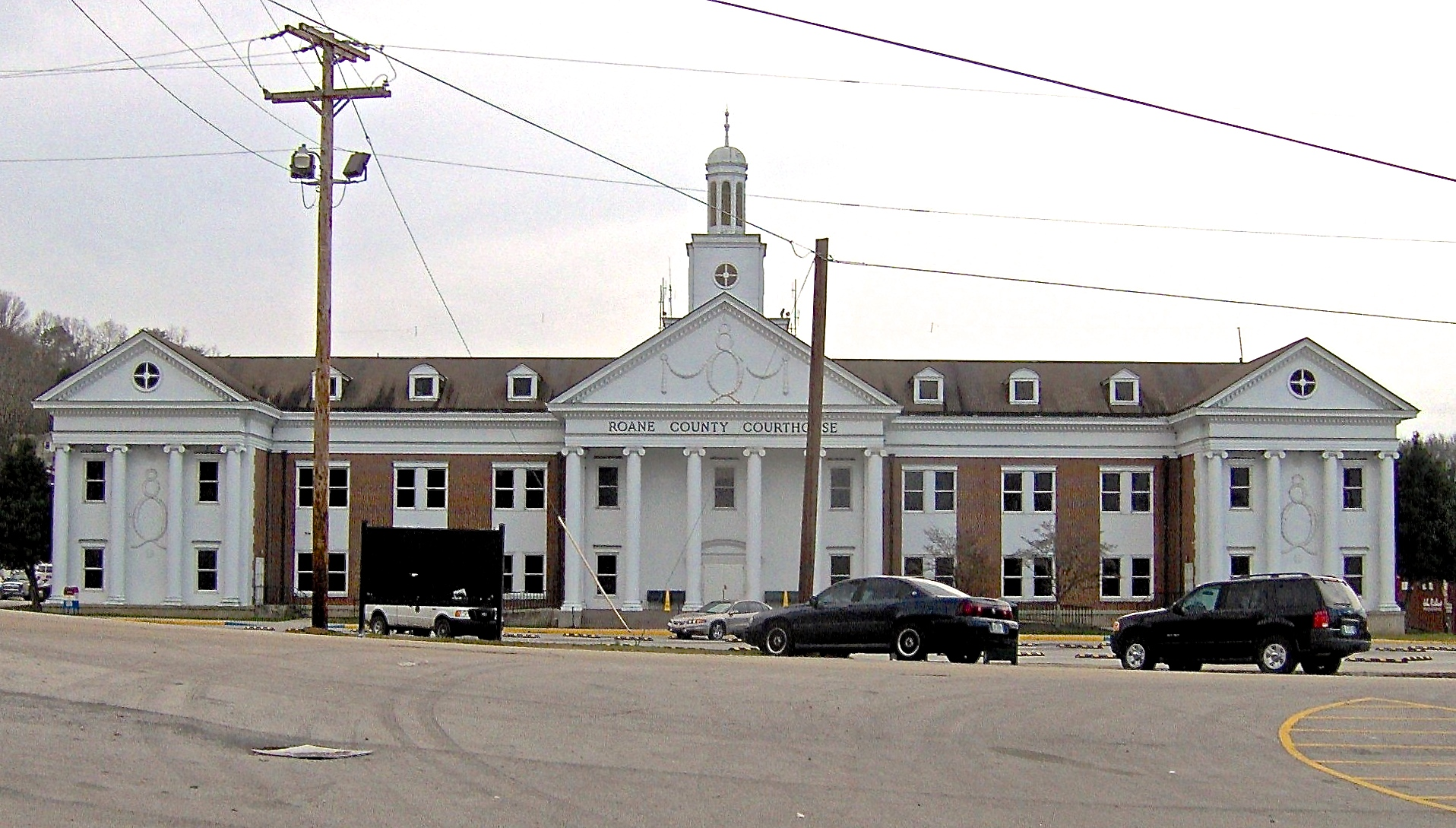
The Roane County Courthouse in Kingston, Tennessee, site of the shooting

The Kingston courthouse shooting was a fatal shooting that occurred on August 9, 2005, at the Roane County Courthouse in Kingston, Tennessee, United States. It resulted in the death of a Tennessee Department of Correction transport officer, and the wounding of another officer. The perpetrator, Jennifer Forsyth Hyatte (born February 11, 1974), began shooting immediately after her husband, George, (born June 30, 1971) pleaded guilty to a robbery charge in the courthouse.

Jennifer Hyatte is currently serving a life sentence without the possibility of parole. George Hyatte pleaded guilty to first-degree murder in the shooting in 2009 and was sentenced to life in prison as part of a plea bargain to avoid the death penalty.

== The shooting ==
At approximately 10:00 a.m., after a court hearing, Tennessee Department of Corrections transport officer Wayne "Cotton" Morgan was fatally shot three times by Jennifer Forsyth Hyatte, whose husband, George Hyatte, pleaded guilty to a charge of robbery. Officer Morgan and his partner were loading prisoners into a transport van after a court appearance, when Jennifer Forsythe Hyatte drove up and opened fire with a handgun, striking Officer Morgan three times in the abdomen. Officer Morgan's partner returned fire as the escaping prisoner climbed inside his wife's vehicle. Jennifer Forsyth Hyatte was a former nurse at a prison where George Hyatte had been an inmate. She had been fired after she was found sneaking food to George. The woman and her inmate husband, who had served two years of a 35 year sentence for aggravated robbery and aggravated assault, fled the scene in the vehicle but switched cars a short distance away. On August 10, the Chevrolet Venture used was found in the parking lot of an Econo Lodge in Erlanger, Kentucky, but neither Hyatte was found. The same night the Hyattes were charged with first-degree murder.

=== Capture ===
On August 10, 2005, around 10:00 p.m., the Hyattes were captured at an America's Best Value Inn located in Columbus, Ohio. The couple was captured after a cab driver named Mike Wagers drove them from Erlanger, Kentucky, to a Best Value Inn.

== Court proceedings ==
On September 17, 2007, Jennifer Hyatte pleaded guilty to first-degree murder and was sentenced to life imprisonment without the possibility of parole. According to the Tennessee Department of Corrections website, her TOMIS (Tennessee Offender Management Information System) number is 00394869, her imprisonment began on 10 August 2005 and she is incarcerated at the Debra K. Johnson Rehabilitation Center in Nashville.

As a condition of the plea bargain which allowed her to avoid the death penalty, she agreed to testify against George Hyatte. However her testimony was not required because subsequently, George Hyatte did not contest the charges made against him. On March 9, 2009, he pleaded guilty to all charges, including the first-degree murder of Officer Wayne "Cotton" Morgan. As a result, George Hyatte was sentenced to life imprisonment without the possibility of parole.
